= Homogeneous coordinate ring =

In algebraic geometry, the homogeneous coordinate ring is a certain commutative ring assigned to any projective variety. If V is an algebraic variety given as a subvariety of projective space of a given dimension N, its homogeneous coordinate ring is by definition the quotient ring

R = K[X_{0}, X_{1}, X_{2}, ..., X_{N}] / I

where I is the homogeneous ideal defining V, K is the algebraically closed field over which V is defined, and

K[X_{0}, X_{1}, X_{2}, ..., X_{N}]

is the polynomial ring in N + 1 variables X_{i}. The polynomial ring is therefore the homogeneous coordinate ring of the projective space itself, and the variables are the homogeneous coordinates, for a given choice of basis (in the vector space underlying the projective space). The choice of basis means this definition is not intrinsic, but it can be made so by using the symmetric algebra.

The definition mimics the coordinate ring as it is introduced for affine varieties.

== Formulation ==
Since V is assumed to be a variety, and so an irreducible algebraic set, the ideal I can be chosen to be a prime ideal, and so R is an integral domain. The same definition can be used for general homogeneous ideals, but the resulting coordinate rings may then contain non-zero nilpotent elements and other divisors of zero. From the point of view of scheme theory these cases may be dealt with on the same footing by means of the Proj construction.

The irrelevant ideal J generated by all the X_{i} corresponds to the empty set, since not all homogeneous coordinates can vanish at a point of projective space.

The projective Nullstellensatz gives a bijective correspondence between projective varieties and homogeneous ideals I not containing J.

== Resolutions and syzygies ==
In application of homological algebra techniques to algebraic geometry, it has been traditional since David Hilbert (though modern terminology is different) to apply free resolutions of R, considered as a graded module over the polynomial ring. This yields information about syzygies, namely relations between generators of the ideal I. In a classical perspective, such generators are simply the equations one writes down to define V. If V is a hypersurface there need only be one equation, and for complete intersections the number of equations can be taken as the codimension; but the general projective variety has no defining set of equations that is so transparent. Detailed studies, for example of canonical curves and the equations defining abelian varieties, show the geometric interest of systematic techniques to handle these cases. The subject also grew out of elimination theory in its classical form, in which reduction modulo I is supposed to become an algorithmic process (now handled by Gröbner bases in practice).

There are for general reasons free resolutions of R as graded module over K[X_{0}, X_{1}, X_{2}, ..., X_{N}]. A resolution is defined as minimal if the image in each module morphism of free modules

φ:F_{i} → F_{i − 1}

in the resolution lies in JF_{i − 1,} where J is the irrelevant ideal. As a consequence of Nakayama's lemma, φ then takes a given basis in F_{i} to a minimal set of generators in F_{i − 1}. The concept of minimal free resolution is well-defined in a strong sense: unique up to isomorphism of chain complexes and occurring as a direct summand in any free resolution. Since this complex is intrinsic to R, one may define the graded Betti numbers β_{i, j} as the number of grade-j images coming from F_{i} (more precisely, by thinking of φ as a matrix of homogeneous polynomials, the count of entries of that homogeneous degree incremented by the gradings acquired inductively from the right). In other words, weights in all the free modules may be inferred from the resolution, and the graded Betti numbers count the number of generators of a given weight in a given module of the resolution. The properties of these invariants of V in a given projective embedding poses active research questions, even in the case of curves.

There are examples where the minimal free resolution is known explicitly. For a rational normal curve it is an Eagon–Northcott complex. For elliptic curves in projective space the resolution may be constructed as a mapping cone of Eagon–Northcott complexes.

== Regularity ==
The Castelnuovo–Mumford regularity may be read off the minimum resolution of the ideal I defining the projective variety. In terms of the imputed "shifts" a_{i, j} in the i-th module F_{i}, it is the maximum over i of the a_{i, j} − i; it is therefore small when the shifts increase only by increments of 1 as we move to the left in the resolution (linear syzygies only).

== Projective normality ==
The variety V in its projective embedding is projectively normal if its homogeneous coordinate ring is integrally closed. This condition implies that V is a normal variety, but not conversely: the property of projective normality is not independent of the projective embedding, as is shown by the example of a rational quartic curve in three dimensions. Another equivalent condition is in terms of the linear system of divisors on V cut out by the dual of the tautological line bundle on projective space, and its d-th powers for d = 1, 2, 3, ... ; when V is non-singular, it is projectively normal if and only if each such linear system is a complete linear system. Alternatively one can think of the dual of the tautological line bundle as the Serre twist sheaf O(1) on projective space, and use it to twist the structure sheaf O_{V} any number of times, say k times, obtaining a sheaf O_{V}(k). Then V is called k-normal if the global sections of O(k) map surjectively to those of O_{V}(k), for a given k, and if V is 1-normal it is called linearly normal. A non-singular variety is projectively normal if and only if it is k-normal for all k ≥ 1. Linear normality may also be expressed geometrically: V as projective variety cannot be obtained by an isomorphic linear projection from a projective space of higher dimension, except in the trivial way of lying in a proper linear subspace. Projective normality may similarly be translated, by using enough Veronese mappings to reduce it to conditions of linear normality.

Looking at the issue from the point of view of a given very ample line bundle giving rise to the projective embedding of V, such a line bundle (invertible sheaf) is said to be normally generated if V as embedded is projectively normal. Projective normality is the first condition N_{0} of a sequence of conditions defined by Green and Lazarsfeld. For this

$$\bigoplus_{d=0}^\infty H^0(V, L^d)$$

is considered as graded module over the homogeneous coordinate ring of the projective space, and a minimal free resolution taken. Condition N_{p} applied to the first p graded Betti numbers, requiring they vanish when j > i + 1. For curves Green showed that condition N_{p} is satisfied when deg(L) ≥ 2g + 1 + p, which for p = 0 was a classical result of Guido Castelnuovo.

== See also ==
- Projective variety
- Hilbert polynomial
