= Quasi-projective variety =

In mathematics, a quasi-projective variety in algebraic geometry is a locally closed subset of a projective variety, i.e., the intersection inside some projective space of a Zariski-open and a Zariski-closed subset. A similar definition is used in scheme theory, where a quasi-projective scheme is a locally closed subscheme of some projective space.

== Relationship to affine varieties ==
An affine space is a Zariski-open subset of a projective space, and since any closed affine subset $U$ can be expressed as an intersection of the projective completion $\bar{U}$ and the affine space embedded in the projective space, this implies that any affine variety is quasiprojective. There are locally closed subsets of projective space that are not affine, so that quasi-projective is more general than affine. Taking the complement of a single point in projective space of dimension at least 2 gives a non-affine quasi-projective variety. This is also an example of a quasi-projective variety that is neither affine nor projective.

== Examples ==
Since quasi-projective varieties generalize both affine and projective varieties, they are sometimes referred to simply as varieties. Varieties isomorphic to affine algebraic varieties as quasi-projective varieties (see Morphism of algebraic varieties) are called affine varieties; similarly for projective varieties. For example, the complement of a point in the affine line, i.e., $X=\mathbb{A}^1 \setminus \{0\}$, is isomorphic to the zero set of the polynomial $xy-1$ in the affine plane. As an affine set $X$ is not closed (when one assumes that the base field be algebraically closed or at least infinite) since any proper closed subset of $\mathbb A^1$ is finite. More generally, the variety $\mathbb A^n\setminus\{f=0\}$, with $f\in k[x_1,\ldots,x_n]$, is isomorphic to the hypersurface in $\mathbb A^{n+1}$ given by the equation $x_{n+1}f-1=0$. For another example, the complement of any conic in projective space of dimension 2 is affine. Varieties isomorphic to open subsets of affine varieties are called quasi-affine.

Quasi-projective varieties (like their generalization, schemes) are locally affine in the same sense that a manifold is locally Euclidean: every point of a quasi-projective variety has a neighborhood which is an affine variety. This yields a basis of affine sets for the Zariski topology on a quasi-projective variety.

== See also ==
- Abstract algebraic variety, sometimes synonymous with "quasi-projective variety"
- divisorial scheme, a generalization of a quasi-projective variety
