= Geometric genus =

Property of algebraic varieties and complex manifolds

In algebraic geometry, the geometric genus is a basic birational invariant p_{g} of algebraic varieties and complex manifolds.

== Definition ==
The geometric genus can be defined for non-singular complex projective varieties and more generally for complex manifolds of dimension n as the Hodge number h^{n,0} (equal to h^{0,n} by Serre duality), that is, the dimension of the canonical linear system plus one.

In other words, for a variety V of complex dimension n it is the number of linearly independent holomorphic n-forms to be found on V. This definition, as the dimension of

H^{0}(V,Ω^{n})

then carries over to any base field, when Ω is taken to be the sheaf of Kähler differentials and the power is the (top) exterior power, the canonical line bundle.

The geometric genus is the first invariant p_{g} = P_{1} of a sequence of invariants P_{n} called the plurigenera.

== Case of curves ==
In the case of complex varieties, (the complex loci of) non-singular curves are Riemann surfaces. The algebraic definition of genus agrees with the topological notion. On a nonsingular curve, the canonical line bundle has degree 2g − 2.

The notion of genus features prominently in the statement of the Riemann–Roch theorem (see also Riemann–Roch theorem for algebraic curves) and of the Riemann–Hurwitz formula. By the Riemann-Roch theorem, an irreducible plane curve of degree d has geometric genus

$$g=\frac{(d-1)(d-2)}{2}-s,$$

where s is the number of singularities when properly counted.

If C is an irreducible (and smooth) hypersurface in the projective plane cut out by a polynomial equation of degree d, then its normal line bundle is the Serre twisting sheaf $\mathcal O$(d), so by the adjunction formula, the canonical line bundle of C is given by

$$\mathcal K_C = \left[ \mathcal K_{\mathbb P^2} + \mathcal O(d) \right]_{\vert C} = \mathcal O(d-3)_{\vert C}$$

== Genus of singular varieties ==
The definition of geometric genus is carried over classically to singular curves C, by decreeing that

p_{g}(C)

is the geometric genus of the normalization C′. That is, since the mapping

C′ → C

is birational, the definition is extended by birational invariance.

== See also ==
- Genus (mathematics)
- Arithmetic genus
- Invariants of surfaces
