= Algebraic geometry of projective spaces =

The concept of a projective space plays a central role in algebraic geometry. This article aims to define the notion in terms of abstract algebraic geometry and to describe some basic uses of projective spaces.

== Homogeneous polynomial ideals ==
Let k be an algebraically closed field, and V be a finite-dimensional vector space over k. The symmetric algebra of the dual vector space V* is called the polynomial ring on V and denoted by k[V]. It is a naturally graded algebra by the degree of polynomials.

The projective Nullstellensatz states that, for any homogeneous ideal I that does not contain all polynomials of a certain degree (referred to as an irrelevant ideal), the common zero locus of all polynomials in I (or Nullstelle) is non-trivial (i.e. the common zero locus contains more than the single element {0}), and, more precisely, the ideal of polynomials that vanish on that locus coincides with the radical of the ideal I.

This last assertion is best summarized by the formula: for any relevant ideal I,

$$\mathcal I (\mathcal V(I)) = \sqrt I .$$

In particular, maximal homogeneous relevant ideals of k[V] are one-to-one with lines through the origin of V.

== Construction of projectivized schemes ==
Let V be a finite-dimensional vector space over a field k. The scheme over k defined by Proj(k[V]) is called projectivization of V. The projective n-space on k is the projectivization of the vector space $\mathbb A_k^{n+1}$.

The definition of the sheaf is done on the base of open sets of principal open sets D(P), where P varies over the set of homogeneous polynomials, by setting the sections

$$\Gamma (D(P), \mathcal O_{\mathbb P (V)})$$

to be the ring $(k[V]_P)_0$, the zero degree component of the ring obtained by localization at P. Its elements are therefore the rational functions with homogeneous numerator and some power of P as the denominator, with same degree as the numerator.

The situation is most clear at a non-vanishing linear form φ. The restriction of the structure sheaf to the open set D(φ) is then canonically identified (Note: In coordinates this correspondence is given by $\frac{P (X_0, \ldots, X_n)} {X_0^{\deg(P)}} \mapsto P(1,X_1,\ldots, X_n)$) with the affine scheme spec(k[ker φ]). Since the D(φ) form an open cover of X the projective schemes can be thought of as being obtained by the gluing via projectivization of isomorphic affine schemes.

It can be noted that the ring of global sections of this scheme is a field, which implies that the scheme is not affine. Any two open sets intersect non-trivially: ie the scheme is irreducible. When the field k is algebraically closed, $\mathbb P(V)$ is in fact an abstract variety, that furthermore is complete. cf. Glossary of scheme theory

== Divisors and twisting sheaves ==
The Proj construction in fact gives more than a mere scheme: a sheaf in graded modules over the structure sheaf is defined in the process. The homogeneous components of this graded sheaf are denoted $\mathcal O (i)$, the Serre twisting sheaves. All of these sheaves are in fact line bundles. By the correspondence between Cartier divisors and line bundles, the first twisting sheaf $\mathcal O(1)$ is equivalent to hyperplane divisors.

Since the ring of polynomials is a unique factorization domain, any prime ideal of height 1 is principal, which shows that any Weil divisor is linearly equivalent to some power of a hyperplane divisor. This consideration proves that the Picard group of a projective space is free of rank 1. That is $\operatorname{Pic}\mathbf P^n_\mathbf k = \mathbb Z$, and the isomorphism is given by the degree of divisors.

=== Classification of vector bundles ===
The invertible sheaves, or line bundles, on the projective space $\mathbb{P}^n_k,\,$ for k a field, are exactly the twisting sheaves $\mathcal{O}(m),\ m \in \mathbb{Z},$ so the Picard group of $\mathbb{P}^n_k$ is isomorphic to $\mathbb{Z}$. The isomorphism is given by the first Chern class.

The space of local sections on an open set $U \subseteq \mathbb P (V)$ of the line bundle $\mathcal O(k)$ is the space of homogeneous degree k regular functions on the cone in V associated to U. In particular, the space of global sections

$$\Gamma (\mathbb P, \mathcal O (m))$$

vanishes if m < 0, and consists of constants in k for m=0 and of homogeneous polynomials of degree m for m > 0. (Hence has dimension $\binom{m + n}{m} = \binom{m + n}{n}$).

The Birkhoff-Grothendieck theorem states that on the projective line, any vector bundle splits in a unique way as a direct sum of the line bundles.

=== Important line bundles ===
The tautological bundle, which appears for instance as the exceptional divisor of the blowing up of a smooth point is the sheaf $\mathcal O (-1)$. The canonical bundle

$\mathcal K(\mathbb{P}^n_k),\,$ is $\mathcal O(-(n+1))$.

This fact derives from a fundamental geometric statement on projective spaces: the Euler sequence.

The negativity of the canonical line bundle makes projective spaces prime examples of Fano varieties, equivalently, their anticanonical line bundle is ample (in fact very ample). Their index (cf. Fano varieties) is given by $\operatorname {Ind} (\mathbb P^n) = n+1$, and, by a theorem of Kobayashi-Ochiai, projective spaces are characterized amongst Fano varieties by the property

$$\operatorname {Ind} (X) = \dim X +1.$$

== Morphisms to projective schemes ==
As affine spaces can be embedded in projective spaces, all affine varieties can be embedded in projective spaces too.

Any choice of a finite system of nonsimultaneously vanishing global sections of a globally generated line bundle defines a morphism to a projective space. A line bundle whose base can be embedded in a projective space by such a morphism is called very ample.

The group of symmetries of the projective space $\mathbb P^n_{\mathbf k}$ is the group of projectivized linear automorphisms $\mathrm {PGL}_{n+1}(\mathbf k)$. The choice of a morphism to a projective space $j : X \to \mathbf P^n$ modulo the action of this group is in fact equivalent to the choice of a globally generating n-dimensional linear system of divisors on a line bundle on X. The choice of a projective embedding of X, modulo projective transformations is likewise equivalent to the choice of a very ample line bundle on X.

A morphism to a projective space $j : X \to \mathbf P^n$ defines a globally generated line bundle by $j^* \mathcal O (1)$ and a linear system

$$j^* (\Gamma (\mathbf P^n, \mathcal O(1))) \subset \Gamma (X, j^*\mathcal O(1) ).$$

If the range of the morphism $j$ is not contained in a hyperplane divisor, then the pull-back is an injection and the linear system of divisors

$j^* (\Gamma (\mathbf P^n, \mathcal O(1)))$ is a linear system of dimension n.

=== An example: the Veronese embeddings ===
The Veronese embeddings are embeddings $\mathbb P^n \to \mathbb P^N$ for $N=\binom{n+d}{d} -1.$

See the answer on MathOverflow for an application of the Veronese embedding to the calculation of cohomology groups of smooth projective hypersurfaces (smooth divisors).

== Curves in projective spaces ==
As Fano varieties, the projective spaces are ruled varieties. The intersection theory of curves in the projective plane yields the Bézout theorem.

== See also ==
=== General algebraic geometry ===
- Scheme (mathematics)
- Projective variety
- Proj construction

=== General projective geometry ===
- Projective space
- Projective geometry
- Homogeneous polynomial
