= Ruled join =

Concept in mathematics

In algebraic geometry, given irreducible subvarieties V, W of a projective space P^{n}, the ruled join of V and W is the union of all lines from V to W in P^{2n+1}, where V, W are embedded into P^{2n+1} so that the last (resp. first) n + 1 coordinates on V (resp. W) vanish. It is denoted by J(V, W). For example, if V and W are linear subspaces, then their join is the linear span of them, the smallest linear subcontaining them.

The join of several subvarieties is defined in a similar way.

== See also ==
- Secant variety
