= Irrelevant ideal =

In mathematics, the irrelevant ideal is the ideal of a graded ring generated by the homogeneous elements of degree greater than zero. It corresponds to the origin in the affine space, which cannot be mapped to a point in the projective space. More generally, a homogeneous ideal of a graded ring is called an irrelevant ideal if its radical contains the irrelevant ideal.

The terminology arises from the connection with algebraic geometry. If R = k[x_{0}, ..., x_{n}] (a multivariate polynomial ring in n+1 variables over an algebraically closed field k) is graded with respect to degree, there is a bijective correspondence between projective algebraic sets in projective n-space over k and homogeneous, radical ideals of R not equal to the irrelevant ideal; this is known as the projective Nullstellensatz. More generally, for an arbitrary graded ring R, the Proj construction disregards all irrelevant ideals of R.
