= Weighted projective space =

In algebraic geometry, a weighted projective space P(a_{0},...,a_{n}) is the projective variety Proj(k[x_{0},...,x_{n}]) associated to the graded ring k[x_{0},...,x_{n}] where the variable x_{k} has degree a_{k}.

== Properties ==
- If d is a positive integer then P(a_{0},a_{1},...,a_{n}) is isomorphic to P(da_{0},da_{1},...,da_{n}). This is a property of the Proj construction; geometrically it corresponds to the d-tuple Veronese embedding. So without loss of generality one may assume that the degrees a_{i} have no common factor.
- Suppose that a_{0},a_{1},...,a_{n} have no common factor, and that d is a common factor of all the a_{i} with i≠j, then P(a_{0},a_{1},...,a_{n}) is isomorphic to P(a_{0}/d,...,a_{j-1}/d,a_{j},a_{j+1}/d,...,a_{n}/d) (note that d is coprime to a_{j}; otherwise the isomorphism does not hold). So one may further assume that any set of n variables a_{i} have no common factor. In this case the weighted projective space is called well-formed.
- The only singularities of weighted projective space are cyclic quotient singularities.
- A weighted projective space is a Q-Fano variety and a toric variety.
- The weighted projective space P(a_{0},a_{1},...,a_{n}) is isomorphic to the quotient of projective space by the group that is the product of the groups of roots of unity of orders a_{0},a_{1},...,a_{n} acting diagonally.
