= Morphism of algebraic varieties =

Concept in mathematics

In algebraic geometry, a morphism between algebraic varieties is a function between the varieties that is given locally by polynomials. It is also called a regular map. A morphism from an algebraic variety to the affine line is also called a regular function. A regular map whose inverse is also regular is called biregular, and the biregular maps are the isomorphisms of algebraic varieties. Because regular and biregular are very restrictive conditions – there are no non-constant regular functions on projective varieties – the concepts of rational and birational maps are widely used as well; they are partial functions that are defined locally by rational fractions instead of polynomials.

An algebraic variety has naturally the structure of a locally ringed space; a morphism between algebraic varieties is precisely a morphism of the underlying locally ringed spaces.

== Definition ==
If X and Y are closed subvarieties of $\mathbb{A}^n$ and $\mathbb{A}^m$ (so they are affine varieties), then a regular map $f\colon X\to Y$ is the restriction of a polynomial map $\mathbb{A}^n\to \mathbb{A}^m$. Explicitly, it has the form:

$$f = (f_1, \dots, f_m)$$

where the $f_i$ are in the coordinate ring of X:

$$k[X] = k[x_1, \dots, x_n]/I,$$

where I is the ideal defining X (note: two polynomials f and g define the same function on X if and only if f − g is in I). The image f(X) lies in Y, and hence satisfies the defining equations of Y. That is, a regular map $f: X \to Y$ is the same as the restriction of a polynomial map whose components satisfy the defining equations of $Y$.

More generally, a map f : X→Y between two varieties is regular at a point x if there is a neighbourhood U of x and a neighbourhood V of f(x) such that f(U) ⊂ V and the restricted function f : U→V is regular as a function on some affine charts of U and V. Then f is called regular, if it is regular at all points of X.

- Note: It is not immediately obvious that the two definitions coincide: if X and Y are affine varieties, then a map f : X→Y is regular in the first sense if and only if it is so in the second sense. (Note: Here is the argument showing the definitions coincide. Clearly, we can assume Y = A^{1}. Then the issue here is whether the "regular-ness" can be patched together; this answer is yes and that can be seen from the construction of the structure sheaf of an affine variety as described at affine variety#Structure sheaf.) Also, it is not immediately clear whether regularity depends on a choice of affine charts (it does not. (Note: It is not clear how to prove this, though. If X, Y are quasi-projective, then the proof can be given. The non-quasi-projective case strongly depends on one's definition of an abstract variety)) This kind of a consistency issue, however, disappears if one adopts the formal definition. Formally, an (abstract) algebraic variety is defined to be a particular kind of a locally ringed space. When this definition is used, a morphism of varieties is just a morphism of locally ringed spaces.

The composition of regular maps is again regular; thus, algebraic varieties form the category of algebraic varieties where the morphisms are the regular maps.

Regular maps between affine varieties correspond contravariantly in one-to-one to algebra homomorphisms between the coordinate rings: if f : X→Y is a morphism of affine varieties, then it defines the algebra homomorphism

$$f^{\#}: k[Y] \to k[X], \, g \mapsto g \circ f$$

where $k[X], k[Y]$ are the coordinate rings of X and Y; it is well-defined since $g \circ f = g(f_1, \dots, f_m)$ is a polynomial in elements of $k[X]$. Conversely, if $\phi: k[Y] \to k[X]$ is an algebra homomorphism, then it induces the morphism

$$\phi^a: X \to Y.$$

Writing $k[Y] = k[y_1, \dots, y_m]/J,$

$$\phi^a = (\phi(\overline{y_1}), \dots, \phi(\overline{y_m})),$$

where the $\overline{y}_i$ are the images of the $y_i$. (Note: The image of $\phi^a$ lies in Y since if g is a polynomial in J, then, a priori thinking $\phi^a$ is a map to the affine space, $g \circ \phi^a = g(\phi(\overline{y_1}), \dots, \phi(\overline{y_m})) = \phi(\overline{g}) = 0$ since g is in J.) Note ${\phi^a}^{\#} = \phi$ as well as ${f^{\#}}^a = f.$ (Note: Proof: ${\phi^a}^{\#}(g) = g(\phi(\overline{y_1}), \dots, \phi(\overline{y_m})) = \phi(g)$ since φ is an algebra homomorphism. Also, $f^{\#a} = (\overline{y_1} \circ f, \dots, \overline{y_m} \circ f) = f.$) In particular, f is an isomorphism of affine varieties if and only if f^{#} is an isomorphism of the coordinate rings.

For example, if X is a closed subvariety of an affine variety Y and f is the inclusion, then f^{#} is the restriction of regular functions on Y to X. See #Examples below for more examples.

== Regular functions ==
In the particular case that $Y$ equals $\mathbb{A}^1$ the regular maps $f:X\rightarrow\mathbb{A}^1$ are called regular functions, and are algebraic analogs of smooth functions studied in differential geometry. The ring of regular functions (that is the coordinate ring or more abstractly the ring of global sections of the structure sheaf) is a fundamental object in affine algebraic geometry. The only regular function on a projective variety is constant (this can be viewed as an algebraic analogue of Liouville's theorem in complex analysis).

A scalar function $f:X\rightarrow\mathbb{A}^1$ is regular at a point $x$ if, in some open affine neighborhood of $x$, it is a rational function that is regular at $x$; i.e., there are regular functions $g$, $h$ near $x$ such that $f=g/h$ and $h$ does not vanish at $x$. (Note: Proof: Let A be the coordinate ring of such an affine neighborhood of x. If f = g/h with some g in A and some nonzero h in A, then f is in A[h^{−1}] = k[D(h)]; that is, f is a regular function on D(h).) Caution: the condition is for some pair (g, h) not for all pairs (g, h); see Examples.

If X is a quasi-projective variety; i.e., an open subvariety of a projective variety, then the function field k(X) is the same as that of the closure $\overline{X}$ of X and thus a rational function on X is of the form g/h for some homogeneous elements g, h of the same degree in the homogeneous coordinate ring $k[\overline{X}]$ of $\overline{X}$ (cf. Projective variety#Variety structure). Then a rational function f on X is regular at a point x if and only if there are some homogeneous elements g, h of the same degree in $k[\overline{X}]$ such that f = g/h and h does not vanish at x. This characterization is sometimes taken as the definition of a regular function.

== Comparison with a morphism of schemes ==
If $X=\operatorname{Spec}A$ and $Y=\operatorname{Spec}B$ are affine schemes, then each ring homomorphism $\phi:B\rightarrow A$ determines a morphism

$$\phi^a: X \to Y, \, \mathfrak{p} \mapsto \phi^{-1}(\mathfrak{p})$$

by taking the pre-images of prime ideals. All morphisms between affine schemes are of this type and gluing such morphisms gives a morphism of schemes in general.

Now, if X, Y are affine varieties; i.e., A, B are integral domains that are finitely generated algebras over an algebraically closed field k, then, working with only the closed points, the above coincides with the definition given at #Definition. (Proof: If f : X → Y is a morphism, then writing $\phi = f^{\#}$, we need to show

$$\mathfrak{m}_{f(x)} = \phi^{-1}(\mathfrak{m}_x)$$

where $\mathfrak{m}_x, \mathfrak{m}_{f(x)}$ are the maximal ideals corresponding to the points x and f(x); i.e., $\mathfrak{m}_x = \{ g \in k[X] \mid g(x) = 0 \}$. This is immediate.)

This fact means that the category of affine varieties can be identified with a full subcategory of affine schemes over k. Since morphisms of varieties are obtained by gluing morphisms of affine varieties in the same way morphisms of schemes are obtained by gluing morphisms of affine schemes, it follows that the category of varieties is a full subcategory of the category of schemes over k.

For more details, see .

== Examples ==
- The regular functions on $\mathbb{A}^n$ are exactly the polynomials in $n$ variables and the regular functions on $\mathbb{P}^n$ are exactly the constants.
- Let $X$ be the affine curve $y = x^2$. Then
  $$f: X \to \mathbf{A}^1, \, (x, y) \mapsto x$$
  is a morphism; it is bijective with the inverse $g(x) = (x, x^2)$. Since $g$ is also a morphism, $f$ is an isomorphism of varieties.
- Let $X$ be the affine curve $y^2 = x^3 + x^2$. Then
  $$f: \mathbf{A}^1 \to X, \, t \mapsto (t^2 - 1, t^3 - t)$$
  is a morphism. It corresponds to the ring homomorphism
  $$f^{\#}: k[X] \to k[t], \, g \mapsto g(t^2 - 1, t^3 - t),$$
  which is seen to be injective (since f is surjective).
- Continuing the preceding example, let U = A^{1} − {1}. Since U is the complement of the hyperplane t = 1, U is affine. The restriction $f: U \to X$ is bijective. But the corresponding ring homomorphism is the inclusion $k[X] = k[t^2 - 1, t^3 - t] \hookrightarrow k[t, (t - 1)^{-1}]$, which is not an isomorphism and so the restriction f |_{U} is not an isomorphism.
- Let X be the affine curve x^{2} + y^{2} = 1 and let
  $$f(x, y) = {1 - y \over x}.$$
  Then f is a rational function on X. It is regular at (0, 1) despite the expression since, as a rational function on X, f can also be written as $f(x, y) = {x \over 1 + y}$.
- Let X = A^{2} − (0, 0). Then X is an algebraic variety since it is an open subset of a variety. If f is a regular function on X, then f is regular on $D_{\mathbf{A}^2}(x) = \mathbf{A}^2 - \{ x = 0 \}$ and so is in $k[D_{\mathbf{A}^2}(x)] = k[\mathbf{A}^2][x^{-1}] = k[x, x^{-1}, y]$. Similarly, it is in $k[x, y, y^{-1}]$. Thus, we can write:
  $$f = {g \over x^n} = {h \over y^m}$$
  where g, h are polynomials in k[x, y]. But this implies g is divisible by x^{n} and so f is in fact a polynomial. Hence, the ring of regular functions on X is just k[x, y]. (This also shows that X cannot be affine since if it were, X is determined by its coordinate ring and thus X = A^{2}.)
- Suppose $\mathbf{P}^1 = \mathbf{A}^1 \cup \{ \infty \}$ by identifying the points (x : 1) with the points x on A^{1} and ∞ = (1 : 0). There is an automorphism σ of P^{1} given by σ(x : y) = (y : x); in particular, σ exchanges 0 and ∞. If f is a rational function on P^{1}, then
  $$\sigma^{\#}(f) = f(1/z)$$
  and f is regular at ∞ if and only if f(1/z) is regular at zero.
- Taking the function field k(V) of an irreducible algebraic curve V, the functions F in the function field may all be realised as morphisms from V to the projective line over k. (cf. #Properties) The image will either be a single point, or the whole projective line (this is a consequence of the completeness of projective varieties). That is, unless F is actually constant, we have to attribute to F the value ∞ at some points of V.
- For any algebraic varieties X, Y, the projection
  $$p: X \times Y \to X, \, (x, y) \mapsto x$$
  is a morphism of varieties. If X and Y are affine, then the corresponding ring homomorphism is
  $$p^{\#}: k[X] \to k[X \times Y] = k[X] \otimes_k k[Y], \, f \mapsto f \otimes 1$$
  where $(f \otimes 1)(x, y) = f(p(x, y)) = f(x)$.

== Properties ==
A morphism between varieties is continuous with respect to Zariski topologies on the source and the target.

The image of a morphism of varieties need not be open nor closed (for example, the image of $\mathbf{A}^2 \to \mathbf{A}^2, \, (x, y) \mapsto (x, xy)$ is neither open nor closed). However, one can still say: if f is a morphism between varieties, then the image of f contains an open dense subset of its closure (cf. constructible set).

A morphism f:X→Y of algebraic varieties is said to be dominant if it has dense image. For such an f, if V is a nonempty open affine subset of Y, then there is a nonempty open affine subset U of X such that f(U) ⊂ V and then $f^{\#}: k[V] \to k[U]$ is injective. Thus, the dominant map f induces an injection on the level of function fields:

$$k(Y) = \varinjlim k[V] \hookrightarrow k(X), \, g \mapsto g \circ f$$

where the direct limit runs over all nonempty open affine subsets of Y. (More abstractly, this is the induced map from the residue field of the generic point of Y to that of X.) Conversely, every inclusion of fields $k(Y) \hookrightarrow k(X)$ is induced by a dominant rational map from X to Y. Hence, the above construction determines a contravariant-equivalence between the category of algebraic varieties over a field k with dominant rational maps between them and the category of finitely generated field extension of k.

If X is a smooth complete curve (for example, P^{1}) and if f is a rational map from X to a projective space P^{m}, then f is a regular map X → P^{m}. In particular, when X is a smooth complete curve, any rational function on X may be viewed as a morphism X → P^{1} and, conversely, such a morphism as a rational function on X.

On a normal variety (in particular, a smooth variety), a rational function is regular if and only if it has no poles of codimension one. (Note: Proof: it's enough to consider the case when the variety is affine and then use the fact that a Noetherian integrally closed domain is the intersection of all the localizations at height-one prime ideals.) This is an algebraic analog of Hartogs' extension theorem. There is also a relative version of this fact; see .

A morphism between algebraic varieties that is a homeomorphism between the underlying topological spaces need not be an isomorphism (a counterexample is given by a Frobenius morphism $t \mapsto t^p$.) On the other hand, if f is bijective birational and the target space of f is a normal variety, then f is biregular. (cf. Zariski's main theorem.)

A regular map between complex algebraic varieties is a holomorphic map. (There is actually a slight technical difference: a regular map is a meromorphic map whose singular points are removable, but the distinction is usually ignored in practice.) In particular, a regular map into the complex numbers is just a usual holomorphic function (complex-analytic function).

== Morphisms to a projective space ==
Let

$$f: X \to \mathbf{P}^m$$

be a morphism from a projective variety to a projective space. Let x be a point of X. Then some i-th homogeneous coordinate of f(x) is nonzero; say, i = 0 for simplicity. Then, by continuity, there is an open affine neighborhood U of x such that

$$f: U \to \mathbf{P}^m - \{ y_0 = 0 \}$$

is a morphism, where y_{i} are the homogeneous coordinates. Note the target space is the affine space A^{m} through the identification $(a_0 : \dots : a_m) = (1 : a_1 / a_0 : \dots : a_m / a_0) \sim (a_1 / a_0, \dots, a_m / a_0)$. Thus, by definition, the restriction f |_{U} is given by

$$f|_U(x) = (g_1(x), \dots, g_m(x))$$

where the g_{i} are regular functions on U. Since X is projective, each g_{i} is a fraction of homogeneous elements of the same degree in the homogeneous coordinate ring k[X] of X. We can arrange the fractions so that they all have the same homogeneous denominator say f_{0}. Then we can write g_{i} = f_{i}/f_{0} for some homogeneous elements f_{i} in k[X]. Hence, going back to the homogeneous coordinates,

$$f(x) = (f_0(x) : f_1(x) : \dots : f_m(x))$$

for all x in U and by continuity for all x in X as long as the f_{i} do not vanish at x simultaneously. If they vanish simultaneously at a point x of X, then, by the above procedure, one can pick a different set of f_{i} that do not vanish at x simultaneously (see Note at the end of the section.)

In fact, the above description is valid for any quasi-projective variety X, an open subvariety of a projective variety $\overline{X}$; the difference being that the f_{i} are in the homogeneous coordinate ring of $\overline{X}$.

Note: The above does not say a morphism from a projective variety to a projective space is given by a single set of polynomials (unlike the affine case). For example, let X be the conic $y^2 = xz$ in P^{2}. Then two maps $(x : y : z) \mapsto (x : y)$ and $(x : y : z) \mapsto (y : z)$ agree on the open subset $\{ (x : y : z) \in X \mid x \ne 0 , z \ne 0 \}$ of X (since $(x : y) = (xy : y^2) = (xy: xz) = (y : z)$) and so defines a morphism $f: X \to \mathbf{P}^1$.

== Fibers of a morphism ==
The important fact is:

Theorem—Let f: X → Y be a dominating (i.e., having dense image) morphism of algebraic varieties, and let r = dim X − dim Y. Then

1. For every irreducible closed subset W of Y and every irreducible component Z of $f^{-1}(W)$ dominating W,
  $$\dim Z \ge \dim W + r.$$
2. There exists a nonempty open subset U in Y such that (a) $U \subset f(X)$ and (b) for every irreducible closed subset W of Y intersecting U and every irreducible component Z of $f^{-1}(W)$ intersecting $f^{-1}(U)$,
  $$\dim Z = \dim W + r.$$

Corollary—Let f: X → Y be a morphism of algebraic varieties. For each x in X, define

$$e(x) = \max \{ \dim Z \mid Z \text{ an irreducible component of } f^{-1}(f(x)) \text{ containing } x \}.$$

Then e is upper-semicontinuous; i.e., for each integer n, the set

$$X_n = \{ x \in X \mid e(x) \ge n \}$$

is closed.

In Mumford's red book, the theorem is proved by means of Noether's normalization lemma. For an algebraic approach where the generic freeness plays a main role and the notion of "universally catenary ring" is a key in the proof, see Eisenbud, Ch. 14 of "Commutative algebra with a view toward algebraic geometry." In fact, the proof there shows that if f is flat, then the dimension equality in 2. of the theorem holds in general (not just generically).

== Degree of a finite morphism ==
Let f: X → Y be a finite surjective morphism between algebraic varieties over a field k. Then, by definition, the degree of f is the degree of the finite field extension of the function field k(X) over f^{*}k(Y). By generic freeness, there is some nonempty open subset U in Y such that the restriction of the structure sheaf O_{X} to f^{−1}(U) is free as O_{Y}|_{U}-module. The degree of f is then also the rank of this free module.

If f is étale and if X, Y are complete, then for any coherent sheaf F on Y, writing χ for the Euler characteristic,

$\chi(f^* F) = \deg(f) \chi (F).$

(The Riemann–Hurwitz formula for a ramified covering shows the "étale" here cannot be omitted.)

In general, if f is a finite surjective morphism, if X, Y are complete and F a coherent sheaf on Y, then from the Leray spectral sequence $\operatorname{H}^p(Y, R^q f_* f^* F) \Rightarrow \operatorname{H}^{p+q}(X, f^* F)$, one gets:

$$\chi(f^* F) = \sum_{q=0}^{\infty} (-1)^{q} \chi(R^q f_* f^* F).$$

In particular, if F is a tensor power $L^{\otimes n}$ of a line bundle, then $R^q f_*(f^* F) = R^q f_* \mathcal{O}_X \otimes L^{\otimes n}$ and since the support of $R^q f_* \mathcal{O}_X$ has positive codimension if q is positive, comparing the leading terms, one has:

$$\operatorname{deg}(f^* L) = \operatorname{deg}(f) \operatorname{deg}(L)$$

(since the generic rank of $f_* \mathcal{O}_X$ is the degree of f.)

If f is étale and k is algebraically closed, then each geometric fiber f^{−1}(y) consists exactly of deg(f) points.

== See also ==
- Algebraic function
- Smooth morphism
- Étale morphisms – The algebraic analogue of local diffeomorphisms.
- Resolution of singularities
- contraction morphism
