= Secant variety =

In algebraic geometry, the secant variety $\operatorname{Sect}(V)$, or the variety of chords, of a projective variety $V \subset \mathbb{P}^r$ is the Zariski closure of the union of all secant lines (chords) to V in $\mathbb{P}^r$:

$$\operatorname{Sect}(V) = \bigcup_{x, y \in V} \overline{xy}$$

(for $x = y$, the line $\overline{xy}$ is the tangent line.) It is also the image under the projection $p_3: (\mathbb{P}^r)^3 \to \mathbb{P}^r$ of the closure Z of the incidence variety

$$\{ (x, y, l) | x \wedge y \wedge l = 0 \}$$.

Note that Z has dimension $2 \dim V + 1$ and so $\operatorname{Sect}(V)$ has dimension at most $2 \dim V + 1$.

More generally, the $k^{th}$ secant variety is the Zariski closure of the union of the linear spaces spanned by collections of k+1 points on $V$. It may be denoted by $\Sigma_k$. The above secant variety is the first secant variety. Unless $\Sigma_k=\mathbb{P}^r$, it is always singular along $\Sigma_{k-1}$, but may have other singular points.

If $V$ has dimension d, the dimension of $\Sigma_k$ is at most $kd+d+k$. A useful tool for computing the dimension of a secant variety is Terracini's lemma.

== Examples ==
A secant variety can be used to show the fact that a smooth projective curve can be embedded into the projective 3-space $\mathbb{P}^3$ as follows. Let $C \subset \mathbb{P}^r$ be a smooth curve. Since the dimension of the secant variety S to C has dimension at most 3, if $r > 3$, then there is a point p on $\mathbb{P}^r$ that is not on S and so we have the projection $\pi_p$ from p to a hyperplane H, which gives the embedding $\pi_p: C \hookrightarrow H \simeq \mathbb{P}^{r-1}$. Now repeat.

If $S \subset \mathbb{P}^5$ is a surface that does not lie in a hyperplane and if $\operatorname{Sect}(S) \ne \mathbb{P}^5$, then S is a Veronese surface.
