= Complete variety =

Type of algebraic variety

In mathematics, in particular in algebraic geometry, a complete algebraic variety is an algebraic variety X, such that for any variety Y the projection morphism

$$X \times Y \to Y$$

is a closed map (i.e. maps closed sets onto closed sets). (Note: Here the product variety X × Y does not carry the product topology, in general; the Zariski topology on it will have more closed sets (except in very simple cases). See also Segre embedding.) This can be seen as an analogue of compactness in topology: a topological space X is compact if and only if the above projection map is closed with respect to topological products.

The image of a complete variety is closed and is a complete variety. A closed subvariety of a complete variety is complete.

A complex variety is complete if and only if it is compact as a complex-analytic variety.

The most common example of a complete variety is a projective variety, but there do exist complete non-projective varieties in dimensions 2 and higher. While any complete nonsingular surface is projective, there exist nonsingular complete varieties in dimension 3 and higher which are not projective. The first examples of non-projective complete varieties were given by Masayoshi Nagata and Heisuke Hironaka. An affine space of positive dimension is not complete.

The morphism taking a complete variety to a point is a proper morphism, in the sense of scheme theory. An intuitive justification of "complete", in the sense of "no missing points", can be given on the basis of the valuative criterion of properness, which goes back to Claude Chevalley.

== See also ==
- Chow's lemma
- Theorem of the cube
- Fano variety
- Complete algebraic curve

== Sources ==
- Section II.4 of Hartshorne, Robin (1977), Algebraic Geometry, Graduate Texts in Mathematics, vol. 52, New York: Springer-Verlag, ISBN 978-0-387-90244-9, MR 0463157
- Chapter 7 of Milne, James S. (2009), Algebraic geometry, v. 5.20
- Section I.9 of Mumford, David (1999), The red book of varieties and schemes, Lecture Notes in Mathematics, vol. 1358 (Second, expanded ed.), Springer-Verlag, doi:10.1007/b62130, ISBN 978-3-540-63293-1
- Danilov, V.I. (2001) [1994], "Complete algebraic variety", Encyclopedia of Mathematics, EMS Press
- Hartshorne, Robin (1977). "Appendix B. Example 3.4.1. (Fig.24)". Algebraic Geometry. Graduate Texts in Mathematics. Vol. 52. Berlin, New York: Springer-Verlag. ISBN 978-0-387-90244-9. MR 0463157. Zbl 0367.14001.
