= Proj construction =

Projective analogue of the spectrum of a ring

In algebraic geometry, Proj is a construction analogous to the spectrum-of-a-ring construction of affine schemes, which produces objects with the typical properties of projective spaces and projective varieties. The construction, while not functorial, is a fundamental tool in scheme theory.

In this article, all rings will be assumed to be commutative and with identity.

== Proj of a graded ring ==
=== Proj as a set ===
Let $S$ be a commutative graded ring, where
$$S = \bigoplus_{i \ge 0} S_i$$
is the direct sum decomposition associated with the gradation. The irrelevant ideal of $S$ is the ideal of elements of positive degree
$$S_+ = \bigoplus_{i > 0} S_i .$$
We say an ideal is homogeneous if it is generated by homogeneous elements. Then, as a set,
$$\operatorname{Proj} S = \{P \subseteq S \text{ homogeneous prime ideal, } S_+ \not\subseteq P \}.$$
For brevity we will sometimes write $X$ for $\operatorname{Proj} S$.

=== Proj as a topological space ===
We may define a topology, called the Zariski topology, on $\operatorname{Proj} S$ by defining the closed sets to be those of the form

$$V(a) = \{ p \in \operatorname{Proj} S \mid a \subseteq p \},$$

where $a$ is a homogeneous ideal of $S$. As in the case of affine schemes it is quickly verified that the $V(a)$ form the closed sets of a topology on $X$.

Indeed, if $(a_i)_{i\in I}$ are a family of ideals, then we have $\bigcap V(a_i) = V \left(\sum a_i\right)$ and if the indexing set I is finite, then $\bigcup V(a_i) = V \left(\prod a_i\right).$

Equivalently, we may take the open sets as a starting point and define

$$D(a) = \{ p \in \operatorname{Proj} S \mid a \not\subseteq p \}.$$

A common shorthand is to denote $D(Sf)$ by $D(f)$, where $Sf$ is the ideal generated by $f$. For any ideal $a$, the sets $D(a)$ and $V(a)$ are complementary, and hence the same proof as before shows that the sets $D(a)$ form a topology on $\operatorname{Proj} S$. The advantage of this approach is that the sets $D(f)$, where $f$ ranges over all homogeneous elements of the ring $S$, form a base for this topology, which is an indispensable tool for the analysis of $\operatorname{Proj} S$, just as the analogous fact for the spectrum of a ring is likewise indispensable.

=== Proj as a scheme ===
We also construct a sheaf on $\operatorname{Proj} S$, called the “structure sheaf” as in the affine case, which makes it into a scheme. As in the case of the Spec construction there are many ways to proceed: the most direct one, which is also highly suggestive of the construction of regular functions on a projective variety in classical algebraic geometry, is the following. For any open set $U$ of $\operatorname{Proj} S$ (which is by definition a set of homogeneous prime ideals of $S$ not containing $S_+$) we define the ring $O_X(U)$ to be the set of all functions

$$f \colon U \to \bigcup_{p \in U} S_{(p)}$$

(where $S_{(p)}$ denotes the subring of the ring of fractions $S_p$ consisting of fractions of homogeneous elements of the same degree) such that for each prime ideal $p$ of $U$:

1. $f(p)$ is an element of $S_{(p)}$;
2. There exists an open subset $V \subseteq U$ containing $p$ and homogeneous elements $s,t$ of $S$ of the same degree such that for each prime ideal $q$ of $V$:
  - $t$ is not in $q$;
  - $f(q) = s/t$

It follows immediately from the definition that the $O_X(U)$ form a sheaf of rings $O_X$ on $\operatorname{Proj} S$, and it may be shown that the pair ($\operatorname{Proj} S$, $O_X$) is in fact a scheme (this is accomplished by showing that each of the open subsets $D(f)$ is in fact an affine scheme).

=== The sheaf associated to a graded module ===
The essential property of $S$ for the above construction was the ability to form localizations $S_{(p)}$ for each prime ideal $p$ of $S$. This property is also possessed by any graded module $M$ over $S$, and therefore with the appropriate minor modifications the preceding section constructs for any such $M$ a sheaf, denoted $\tilde{M}$, of $O_X$-modules on $\operatorname{Proj} S$. This sheaf is quasicoherent by construction. If $S$ is generated by finitely many elements of degree $1$ (e.g. a polynomial ring or a homogenous quotient of it), all quasicoherent sheaves on $\operatorname{Proj} S$ arise from graded modules by this construction. The corresponding graded module is not unique.

=== The twisting sheaf of Serre ===
A special case of the sheaf associated to a graded module is when we take $M$ to be $S$ itself with a different grading: namely, we let the degree $d$ elements of $M$ be the degree $(d+1)$ elements of $S$, so
$$M_d = S_{d+1}$$
and denote $M = S(1)$. We then obtain $\tilde{M}$ as a quasicoherent sheaf on $\operatorname{Proj} S$, denoted $O_X(1)$ or simply $\mathcal{O}(1)$, called the twisting sheaf of Serre. It can be checked that $\mathcal{O}(1)$ is in fact an invertible sheaf.

One reason for the utility of $\mathcal{O}(1)$ is that it recovers the algebraic information of $S$ that was lost when, in the construction of $O_X$, we passed to fractions of degree zero. In the case Spec A for a ring A, the global sections of the structure sheaf form A itself, whereas the global sections of $\mathcal{O}_X$ here form only the degree-zero elements of $S$. If we define

$$\mathcal{O}(n) = \bigotimes_{i = 1}^n \mathcal{O}(1)$$

then each $\mathcal{O}(n)$ contains the degree-$n$ information about $S$, denoted $S_n$, and taken together they contain all the grading information that was lost. Likewise, for any sheaf of graded $\mathcal{O}_X$-modules $N$ we define

$$N(n) = N \otimes \mathcal{O}(n)$$

and expect this “twisted” sheaf to contain grading information about $N$. In particular, if $N$ is the sheaf associated to a graded $S$-module $M$ we likewise expect it to contain lost grading information about $M$. This suggests, though erroneously, that $S$ can in fact be reconstructed from these sheaves; as
$$\bigoplus_{n \geq 0 } \Gamma(X,\mathcal{O}_X(n)).$$
However, this is true in the case that $S$ is a polynomial ring, below. This situation is to be contrasted with the fact that the Spec functor is adjoint to the global sections functor in the category of locally ringed spaces.

=== Projective n-space ===
If $A$ is a ring, we define projective n-space over $A$ to be the scheme

$$\mathbb{P}^n_A = \operatorname{Proj} A[x_0,\ldots, x_n].$$

The grading on the polynomial ring $S=A[x_0,\ldots, x_n]$ is defined by letting each $x_i$ have degree one and every element of $A$, degree zero. Comparing this to the definition of $\mathcal{O}(1)$, above, we see that the sections of $\mathcal{O}(1)$ are in fact linear homogeneous polynomials, generated by the $x_i$ themselves. This suggests another interpretation of $\mathcal{O}(1)$, namely as the sheaf of “coordinates” for $\operatorname{Proj} S$, since the $x_i$ are literally the coordinates for projective $n$-space.

== Examples of Proj ==
=== Proj over the affine line ===
If we let the base ring be $A = \mathbb{C}[\lambda]$, then
$$X = \operatorname{Proj}\left(
\frac{A[X, Y, Z]_\bullet}{(ZY^2 - X(X - Z)(X - \lambda Z))_\bullet} \right)$$
has a canonical projective morphism to the affine line $\mathbb{A}^1_\lambda$ whose fibers are elliptic curves except at the points $\lambda = 0,1$ where the curves degenerate into nodal curves. So there is a fibration
$$\begin{matrix}
E_\lambda &\longrightarrow& X \\
&& \downarrow \\
&& \mathbb{A}^1_\lambda - \{0,1\}
\end{matrix}$$
which is also a smooth morphism of schemes (which can be checked using the Jacobian criterion).

=== Projective hypersurfaces and varieties ===
The projective hypersurface $\operatorname{Proj}\left( \mathbb{C}[X_0,\ldots,X_4]/(X_0^5 + \cdots + X_4^5) \right)$ is an example of a Fermat quintic threefold which is also a Calabi–Yau manifold. In addition to projective hypersurfaces, any projective variety cut out by a system of homogeneous polynomials
$$f_1=0,\ldots, f_k = 0$$
in $(n+1)$-variables can be converted into a projective scheme using the proj construction for the graded algebra
$$\frac{k[X_0,\ldots,X_n]_\bullet}{(f_1,\ldots, f_k)_\bullet}$$
giving an embedding of projective varieties into projective schemes.

=== Weighted projective space ===
Weighted projective spaces can be constructed using a polynomial ring whose variables have non-standard degrees. For example, the weighted projective space $\mathbb{P}(1,1,2)$ corresponds to taking $\operatorname{Proj}$ of the ring $A[X_0,X_1,X_2]$ where $X_0, X_1$ have weight $1$ while $X_2$ has weight 2.

=== Bigraded rings ===
The proj construction extends to bigraded and multigraded rings. Geometrically, this corresponds to taking products of projective schemes. For example, given the graded rings
$$A_\bullet = \mathbb{C}[X_0,X_1], \text{ } B_\bullet = \mathbb{C}[Y_0,Y_1]$$
with the degree of each generator $1$. Then, the tensor product of these algebras over $\mathbb{C}$ gives the bigraded algebra
$$\begin{align}
A_\bullet \otimes_\mathbb{C} B_\bullet &= S_{\bullet,\bullet}\\
&=\mathbb{C}[X_0,X_1,Y_0,Y_1]
\end{align}$$
where the $X_i$ have weight $(1,0)$ and the $Y_i$ have weight $(0,1)$. Then the proj construction gives
$$\text{Proj}(S_{\bullet, \bullet}) = \mathbb{P}^1\times_{\text{Spec}(\mathbb{C})}\mathbb{P}^1$$
which is a product of projective schemes. There is an embedding of such schemes into projective space by taking the total graded algebra
$$S_{\bullet,\bullet} \to S_{\bullet}$$
where a degree $(a,b)$ element is considered as a degree $(a+b)$ element. This means the $k$-th graded piece of $S_\bullet$ is the module
$$S_k = \bigoplus_{a+b = k} S_{a,b}$$
In addition, the scheme $\text{Proj}(S_{\bullet,\bullet})$ now comes with bigraded sheaves $\mathcal{O}(a,b)$ which are the tensor product of the sheaves $\pi_1^*\mathcal{O}(a) \otimes \pi_2^*\mathcal{O}(b)$ where
$$\pi_1: \text{Proj}(S_{\bullet,\bullet}) \to \text{Proj}(A_\bullet)$$
and
$$\pi_2: \text{Proj}(S_{\bullet,\bullet}) \to \text{Proj}(B_\bullet)$$
are the canonical projections coming from the injections of these algebras from the tensor product diagram of commutative algebras.

== Global Proj ==
A generalization of the Proj construction replaces the ring S with a sheaf of algebras and produces, as the result, a scheme which might be thought of as a fibration of Proj's of rings. This construction is often used, for example, to construct projective space bundles over a base scheme.

=== Assumptions ===
Formally, let X be any scheme and S be a sheaf of graded $O_X$-algebras (the definition of which is similar to the definition of $O_X$-modules on a locally ringed space): that is, a sheaf with a direct sum decomposition

$$S = \bigoplus_{i \geq 0} S_i$$

where each $S_i$ is an $O_X$-module such that for every open subset U of X, S(U) is an $O_X(U)$-algebra and the resulting direct sum decomposition

$$S(U) = \bigoplus_{i \geq 0} S_i(U)$$

is a grading of this algebra as a ring. Here we assume that $S_0 = O_X$. We make the additional assumption that S is a quasi-coherent sheaf; this is a “consistency” assumption on the sections over different open sets that is necessary for the construction to proceed.

=== Construction ===
In this setup we may construct a scheme $\operatorname{\mathbf{Proj}} S$ and a “projection” map p onto X such that for every open affine U of X,

$$(\operatorname{\mathbf{Proj}} S)|_{p^{-1}(U)} = \operatorname{Proj} (S(U)).$$

This definition suggests that we construct $\operatorname{\mathbf{Proj}} S$ by first defining schemes $Y_U$ for each open affine U, by setting

$$Y_U = \operatorname{Proj} S(U),$$

and maps $p_U \colon Y_U \to U$, and then showing that these data can be glued together “over” each intersection of two open affines U and V to form a scheme Y which we define to be $\operatorname{\mathbf{Proj}} S$. It is not hard to show that defining each $p_U$ to be the map corresponding to the inclusion of $O_X(U)$ into S(U) as the elements of degree zero yields the necessary consistency of the $p_U$, while the consistency of the $Y_U$ themselves follows from the quasi-coherence assumption on S.

=== The twisting sheaf ===
If S has the additional property that $S_1$ is a coherent sheaf and locally generates S over $S_0$ (that is, when we pass to the stalk of the sheaf S at a point x of X, which is a graded algebra whose degree-zero elements form the ring $O_{X,x}$ then the degree-one elements form a finitely-generated module over $O_{X,x}$ and also generate the stalk as an algebra over it) then we may make a further construction. Over each open affine U, Proj S(U) bears an invertible sheaf O(1), and the assumption we have just made ensures that these sheaves may be glued just like the $Y_U$ above; the resulting sheaf on $\operatorname{\mathbf{Proj}} S$ is also denoted O(1) and serves much the same purpose for $\operatorname{\mathbf{Proj}} S$ as the twisting sheaf on the Proj of a ring does.

=== Proj of a quasi-coherent sheaf ===
Let $\mathcal E$ be a quasi-coherent sheaf on a scheme $X$. The sheaf of symmetric algebras $\mathbf{Sym}_{O_X}(\mathcal E)$ is naturally a quasi-coherent sheaf of graded $O_X$-modules, generated by elements of degree 1. The resulting scheme is denoted by $\mathbb P(\mathcal E)$. If $\mathcal E$ is of finite type, then its canonical morphism $p : \mathbb P(\mathcal E)\to X$ is a projective morphism.

For any $x\in X$, the fiber of the above morphism over $x$ is the projective space $\mathbb P(\mathcal E(x))$ associated to the dual of the vector space $\mathcal E(x):=\mathcal E\otimes_{O_X} k(x)$ over $k(x)$.

If $\mathcal S$ is a quasi-coherent sheaf of graded $O_X$-modules, generated by $\mathcal S_1$ and such that $\mathcal S_1$ is of finite type, then $\mathbf{Proj}\mathcal S$ is a closed subscheme of $\mathbb P(\mathcal S_1)$ and is then projective over $X$. In fact, every closed subscheme of a projective $\mathbb P(\mathcal E)$ is of this form.

=== Projective space bundles ===
As a special case, when $\mathcal E$ is locally free of rank $n+1$, we get a projective bundle $\mathbb P(\mathcal E)$ over $X$ of relative dimension $n$. Indeed, if we take an open cover of X by open affines $U=\operatorname{Spec}(A)$ such that when restricted to each of these, $\mathcal E$ is free over A, then

$$\mathbb P(\mathcal E)|_{p^{-1}(U)} \simeq \operatorname{Proj} A[x_0, \dots, x_n] = \mathbb{P}^n_A = \mathbb{P}^n_U,$$

and hence $\mathbb P(\mathcal E)$ is a projective space bundle. Many families of varieties can be constructed as subschemes of these projective bundles, such as the Weierstrass family of elliptic curves. For more details, see the main article.

== Example of Global Proj ==
Global Proj can be used to construct Lefschetz pencils. For example, let $X = \mathbb{P}^1_{s,t}$ and take homogeneous polynomials $f,g \in \mathbb{C}[x_0,\ldots,x_n]$ of degree k. We can consider the ideal sheaf $\mathcal{I} = (sf + tg)$ of $\mathcal{O}_X[x_0,\ldots,x_n]$ and construct global Proj of this quotient sheaf of algebras $\mathcal{O}_X[x_0,\ldots,x_n]/\mathcal{I}$. This can be described explicitly as the projective morphism $\operatorname{Proj}(\mathbb{C}[s,t][x_0,\ldots,x_n]/(sf + tg)) \to \mathbb{P}^1_{s,t}$.

Another application is the blow-up of a scheme with respect to a coherent sheaf of ideals.

== See also ==
- Projective space
- Algebraic geometry of projective spaces
- Projectivization
