= Cone of curves =

Concept in algebraic geometry

In mathematics, the cone of curves (sometimes the Kleiman-Mori cone) of an algebraic variety $X$ is a combinatorial invariant of importance to the birational geometry of $X$.

== Definition ==
Let $X$ be a proper variety. By definition, a (real) 1-cycle on $X$ is a formal linear combination $C=\sum a_iC_i$ of irreducible, reduced and proper curves $C_i$, with coefficients $a_i \in \mathbb{R}$. Numerical equivalence of 1-cycles is defined by intersections: two 1-cycles $C$ and $C'$ are numerically equivalent if $C \cdot D = C' \cdot D$ for every Cartier divisor $D$ on $X$. Denote the real vector space of 1-cycles modulo numerical equivalence by $N_1(X)$.

We define the cone of curves of $X$ to be

$$NE(X) = \left\{\sum a_i[C_i], \ 0 \leq a_i \in \mathbb{R} \right\}$$

where the $C_i$ are irreducible, reduced, proper curves on $X$, and $[C_i]$ their classes in $N_1(X)$. It is not difficult to see that $NE(X)$ is indeed a convex cone in the sense of convex geometry.

== Applications ==
One useful application of the notion of the cone of curves is the Kleiman condition, which says that a (Cartier) divisor $D$ on a complete variety $X$ is ample if and only if $D \cdot x > 0$ for any nonzero element $x$ in $\overline{NE(X)}$, the closure of the cone of curves in the usual real topology. (In general, $NE(X)$ need not be closed, so taking the closure here is important.)

A more involved example is the role played by the cone of curves in the theory of minimal models of algebraic varieties. Briefly, the goal of that theory is as follows: given a (mildly singular) projective variety $X$, find a (mildly singular) variety $X'$ which is birational to $X$, and whose canonical divisor $K_{X'}$ is nef. The great breakthrough of the early 1980s (due to Mori and others) was to construct (at least morally) the necessary birational map from $X$ to $X'$ as a sequence of steps, each of which can be thought of as contraction of a $K_X$-negative extremal ray of $NE(X)$. This process encounters difficulties, however, whose resolution necessitates the introduction of the flip.

== A structure theorem ==
The above process of contractions could not proceed without the fundamental result on the structure of the cone of curves known as the Cone Theorem. The first version of this theorem, for smooth varieties, is due to Mori; it was later generalised to a larger class of varieties by Kawamata, Kollár, Reid, Shokurov, and others. Mori's version of the theorem is as follows:

Cone Theorem. Let $X$ be a smooth projective variety. Then

1. There are countably many rational curves $C_i$ on $X$, satisfying $0< -K_X \cdot C_i \leq \operatorname{dim} X +1$, and

$$\overline{NE(X)} = \overline{NE(X)}_{K_X\geq 0} + \sum_i \mathbf{R}_{\geq0} [C_i].$$

2. For any positive real number $\epsilon$ and any ample divisor $H$,

$$\overline{NE(X)} = \overline{NE(X)}_{K_X+\epsilon H\geq0} + \sum \mathbf{R}_{\geq0} [C_i],$$

where the sum in the last term is finite.

The first assertion says that, in the closed half-space of $N_1(X)$ where intersection with $K_X$ is nonnegative, we know nothing, but in the complementary half-space, the cone is spanned by some countable collection of curves which are quite special: they are rational, and their 'degree' is bounded very tightly by the dimension of $X$. The second assertion then tells us more: it says that, away from the hyperplane $\{C : K_X \cdot C = 0\}$, extremal rays of the cone cannot accumulate. When $X$ is a Fano variety, $\overline{NE(X)}_{K_X\geq 0} = 0$ because $-K_X$ is ample. So the cone theorem shows that the cone of curves of a Fano variety is generated by rational curves.

If in addition the variety $X$ is defined over a field of characteristic 0, we have the following assertion, sometimes referred to as the Contraction Theorem:

3. Let $F \subset \overline{NE(X)}$ be an extremal face of the cone of curves on which $K_X$ is negative. Then there is a unique morphism $\operatorname{cont}_F : X \rightarrow Z$ to a projective variety Z, such that $(\operatorname{cont}_F)_* \mathcal{O}_X = \mathcal{O}_Z$ and an irreducible curve $C$ in $X$ is mapped to a point by $\operatorname{cont}_F$ if and only if $[C] \in F$. (See also: contraction morphism).
