= Vyacheslav Shokurov =

Russian mathematician (born 1950)

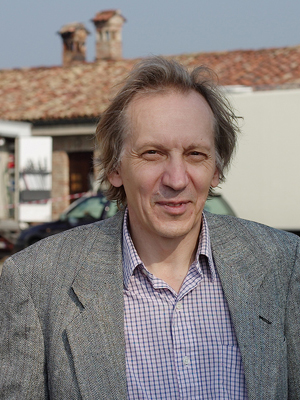
- Shokurov in 2002
- Born: 18 May 1950 (age 76); Moscow, USSR
- Education: Moscow State University
- Scientific career
- Fields: Mathematics, algebraic geometry
- Workplaces: Johns Hopkins University; Steklov Institute of Mathematics
- Doctoral advisor: Yuri Manin
- Doctoral students: Caucher Birkar

Vyacheslav Vladimirovich Shokurov (Russian: Вячеслав Владимирович Шокуров; born 18 May 1950) is a Russian mathematician best known for his research in algebraic geometry. The proof of the Noether–Enriques–Petri theorem, the cone theorem, the existence of a line on smooth Fano varieties and the existence of log flips are several of Shokurov's contributions to the subject.

== Early years ==
In 1968 Shokurov became a student at the Faculty of Mechanics and Mathematics of Moscow State University. Already as an undergraduate, Shokurov showed himself to be a mathematician of outstanding talent. In 1970, he proved the scheme analog of the Noether–Enriques–Petri theorem, which later allowed him to solve a Schottky-type problem for the polarized Prym varieties, and to prove the existence of a line on smooth Fano varieties.

Upon his graduation Shokurov entered the Ph.D. program in Moscow State University under the supervision of Yuri Manin. At this time Shokurov studied the geometry of Kuga varieties. The results obtained in this area became the body of his thesis and he was awarded his Ph.D. ("candidate degree") in 1976.

== Work on birational geometry ==
Shokurov works on the birational geometry of algebraic varieties. After obtaining his Ph.D., he worked at the Yaroslavl State Pedagogical University together with Zalman Skopec. It was Skopec and another colleague, Vasily Iskovskikh, who influenced considerably the development of Shokurov's mathematical interests at that time. Iskovskikh, who was working on the classification of three-dimensional smooth Fano varieties of principal series, posed two classical problems to Shokurov: the existence of a line on smooth Fano varieties and the smoothness of a general element in the anticanonical linear system of any such variety. Shokurov solved both of these problems for three-dimensional Fano varieties and the methods which he introduced for this purpose were later developed in the works of other mathematicians, who generalized Shokurov's ideas to the case of higher-dimensional Fano varieties, and even to the Fano varieties with (admissible) singularities.

In 1983, Shokurov's paper Prym varieties: theory and applications was published. In it Shokurov brought to a completion the work on solving the Schottky-type problem for Prym varieties which originated in papers of Arnaud Beauville and Andrey Tyurin. Shokurov proved a criterion which allows to decide whether the principally polarized Prym variety of a Beauville's pair, subject to some stability conditions, is the Jacobian of some smooth curve. As the main application this criterion provided the Iskovskikh's criterion for rationality of a standard conic bundle whose base is a smooth minimal rational surface.

== Log flips ==
Since the late 80's Shokurov began to contribute to the development of the Minimal model program (MMP). In 1984 he published a paper titled On the closed cone of curves of algebraic 3-folds where he proved that the negative part of the closed cone of effective curves on an algebraic 3-fold (with admissible singularities) is locally polyhedral. A bit later, in 1985, Shokurov published a paper titled The nonvanishing theorem, which became a cornerstone for the whole MMP as it was used in the proofs of such fundamental theorems as the Cone theorem and the Semi-ampleness theorem. Also in this paper, Shokurov proved the termination of three-dimensional flips. And even though he proved this only for three-dimensional varieties, most of his techniques were later generalized by Yujiro Kawamata to obtain similar results for varieties of any dimension.

One of Shokurov's ideas formed a basis for a paper titled 3-fold log flips where the existence of three-dimensional flips (first proved by Shigefumi Mori) was established in a more general log setting. The inductive method and the singularity theory of log pairs developed in the framework of that paper allowed most of the paper's results to be later generalized to arbitrary-dimensional varieties. Later on, in 2001, Shokurov announced the proof of the existence of 4-dimensional log flips, whose complete version appeared in two books: Flips for 3-folds and 4-folds and Birational geometry: linear systems and finitely-generated algebras. An application of Shokurov's ideas concerning the existence of log flips has led to the paper Existence of minimal models for varieties of log general type by Caucher Birkar, Paolo Cascini, Christopher Hacon and James McKernan.

== Later career ==
Shokurov is presently a full professor at Johns Hopkins University in Baltimore and a non-tenured faculty member of the Steklov Institute of Mathematics in Moscow. He is involved both in research and in teaching and he has supervised 9 Ph.D. students in different problems of birational geometry, including Fields medallist Caucher Birkar, Florin Ambro, Ivan Cheltsov, Jihun Park, Sung Rak Choi, Yifei Chen, Joseph Cutrone, and Nicholas Marshburn.

== Selected papers ==
- Iskovskikh, Vasiliĭ A.; Shokurov, Vyacheslav V. (2005). "Birational models and flips". Russian Mathematical Surveys. 60 (1): 27–94. Bibcode:2005RuMaS..60...27I. doi:10.1070/rm2005v060n01abeh000807. ISSN 0036-0279. MR 2145659.
- Shokurov, Vyacheslav V. (2003). "Prelimiting flips". Proceedings of the Steklov Institute of Mathematics. 240 (1): 75–213. MR 1993750.
- Shokurov, Vyacheslav V. (1993). "Three-dimensional log perestroikas". Russian Academy of Sciences. Izvestiya Mathematics. 40 (1): 95–202. doi:10.1070/IM1993v040n01ABEH001862. MR 1162635.
- Shokurov, Vyacheslav V. (1986). "A nonvanishing theorem". Izvestiya Akademii Nauk SSSR. Seriya Matematicheskaya. 26 (3): 591–604. Bibcode:1986IzMat..26..591S. doi:10.1070/IM1986v026n03ABEH001160. MR 0794958.
- V V Shokurov, On the closed cone of curves of algebraic 3-folds, MATH USSR IZV, 1985, 24 (1), 193–198.
- V V Shokurov, Prym varieties: theory and applications, MATH USSR IZV, 1984, 23 (1), 83–147.
- V V Sokurov, The existence of a straight line on fano 3-folds, MATH USSR IZV, 1980, 15 (1), 173–209.
- V V Sokurov, Smoothness of the general anticanonical divisor on a fano 3-fold, MATH USSR IZV, 1980, 14 (2), 395-405.
- V V Sokurov, The Noether–Enriques theorem on canonical curves, MATH USSR SB, 1971, 15 (3), 361–403.
