= Yujiro Kawamata =

Japanese mathematician

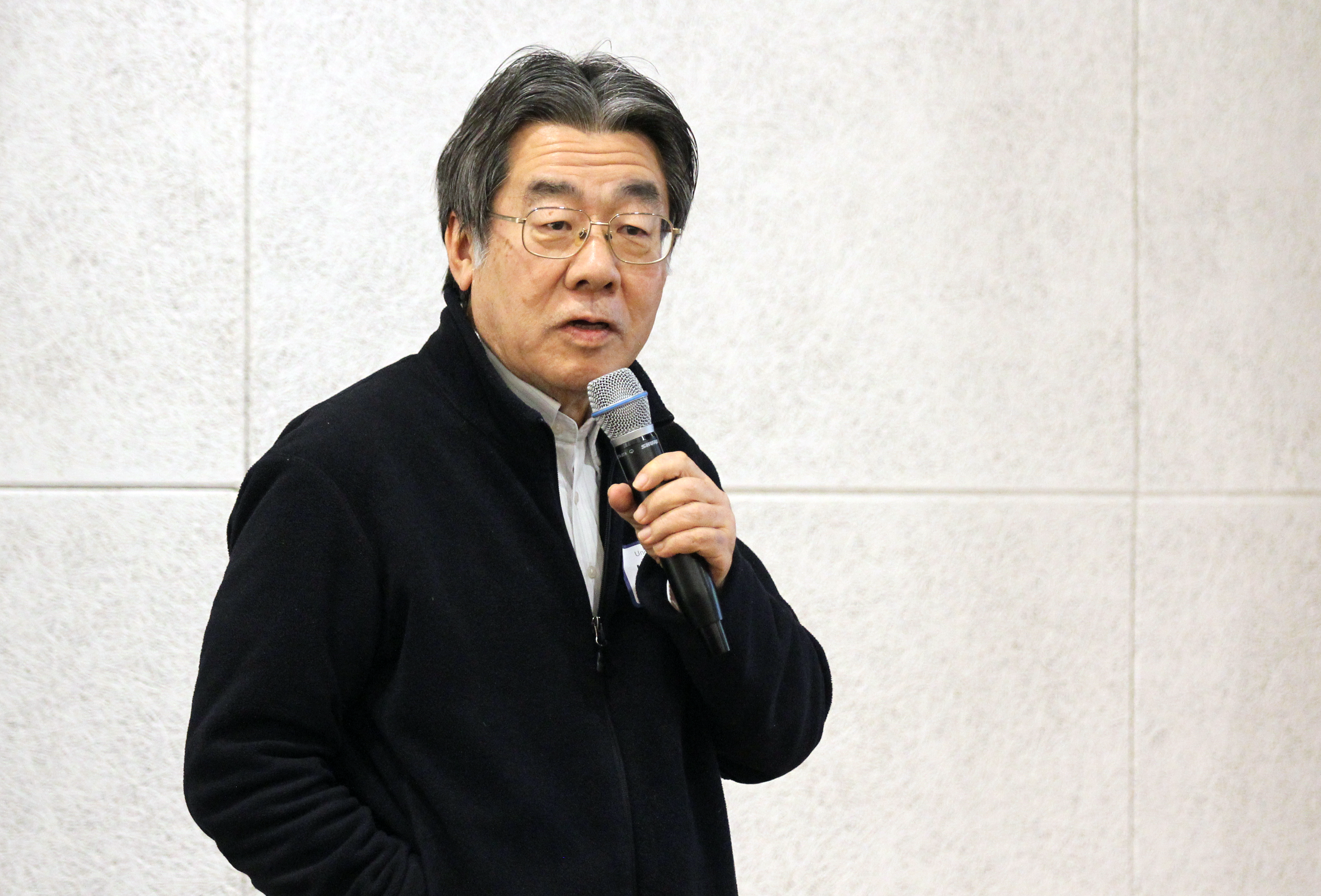
- Education: University of Tokyo
- Known for: Kawamata-Viehweg vanishing theorem Kawamata log terminal (klt) singularities
- Scientific career
- Fields: Mathematics
- Workplaces: University of Tokyo
- Doctoral advisor: Shigeru Iitaka

Yujiro Kawamata (born 1952) is a Japanese mathematician working in algebraic geometry.

== Career ==
Kawamata completed the master's course at the University of Tokyo in 1977. He was an Assistant at the University of Mannheim from 1977 to 1979 and a Miller Fellow at the University of California, Berkeley from 1981 to 1983. Kawamata is now a professor at the University of Tokyo. He won the Mathematical Society of Japan Autumn award (1988) and the Japan Academy of Sciences award (1990) for his work in algebraic geometry.

== Research ==
Kawamata was involved in the development of the minimal model program in the 1980s. The program aims to show that every algebraic variety is birational to one of an especially simple type: either a minimal model or a Fano fiber space. The Kawamata-Viehweg vanishing theorem, strengthening the Kodaira vanishing theorem, is a method. Building on that, Kawamata proved the basepoint-free theorem. The cone theorem and contraction theorem, central results in the theory, are the result of a joint effort by Kawamata, Kollár, Mori, Reid, and Shokurov.

After Mori proved the existence of minimal models in dimension 3 in 1988, Kawamata and Miyaoka clarified the structure of minimal models by proving the abundance conjecture in dimension 3. Kawamata used analytic methods in Hodge theory to prove the Iitaka conjecture over a base of dimension 1.

More recently, a series of papers by Kawamata related the derived category of coherent sheaves on an algebraic variety to geometric properties in the spirit of minimal model theory.
