= Crepant resolution =

In algebraic geometry, a crepant resolution of a singularity is a resolution that does not affect the canonical class of the manifold. The term "crepant" was coined by Miles Reid (1983) by removing the prefix "dis" from the word "discrepant", to indicate that the resolutions have no discrepancy in the canonical class.

The crepant resolution conjecture of Ruan (2006) states that the orbifold cohomology of a Gorenstein orbifold is isomorphic to a semiclassical limit of the quantum cohomology of a crepant resolution.

In 2 dimensions, crepant resolutions of complex Gorenstein quotient singularities (du Val singularities) always exist and are unique, in 3 dimensions they exist but need not be unique as they can be related by flops, and in dimensions greater than 3 they need not exist.

A substitute for crepant resolutions which always exists is a terminal model. Namely, for every variety X over a field of characteristic zero such that X has canonical singularities (for example, rational Gorenstein singularities), there is a variety Y with Q-factorial terminal singularities and a birational projective morphism f: Y → X which is crepant in the sense that K_{Y} = f*K_{X}.
