= Canonical singularity =

Singularities of algebraic varieties

In mathematics, canonical singularities are a class of singularities that appear on the canonical model of an algebraic variety, and terminal singularities are a narrower class that occur as singularities of minimal models. These classes of singularities were introduced by Miles Reid (1980). Terminal singularities are important in the minimal model program because smooth minimal models do not exist in the desired generality, and hence certain "mild" singularities must be allowed.

== Definition ==
Let X be a normal variety over a field whose canonical class K_{X} is $\mathbb Q$-Cartier (as discussed below), and let $f\colon Y \to X$ be a resolution of singularities of X. Using that Cartier divisors can be pulled back, one can write

$$\displaystyle K_Y = f^*(K_X)+\sum_i a_iE_i$$

where the sum is over the exceptional divisors of f (the codimension-1 subvarieties of Y, these being irreducible by definition, whose image in X has codimension at least 2). The a_{i} are rational numbers, called the discrepancies.

Then X is said to be

- terminal if $a_i>0$ for all i,
- canonical if $a_i\geq 0$ for all i.

(One can also say that X has "terminal singularities" or "canonical singularities".) These properties are independent of the choice of resolution.

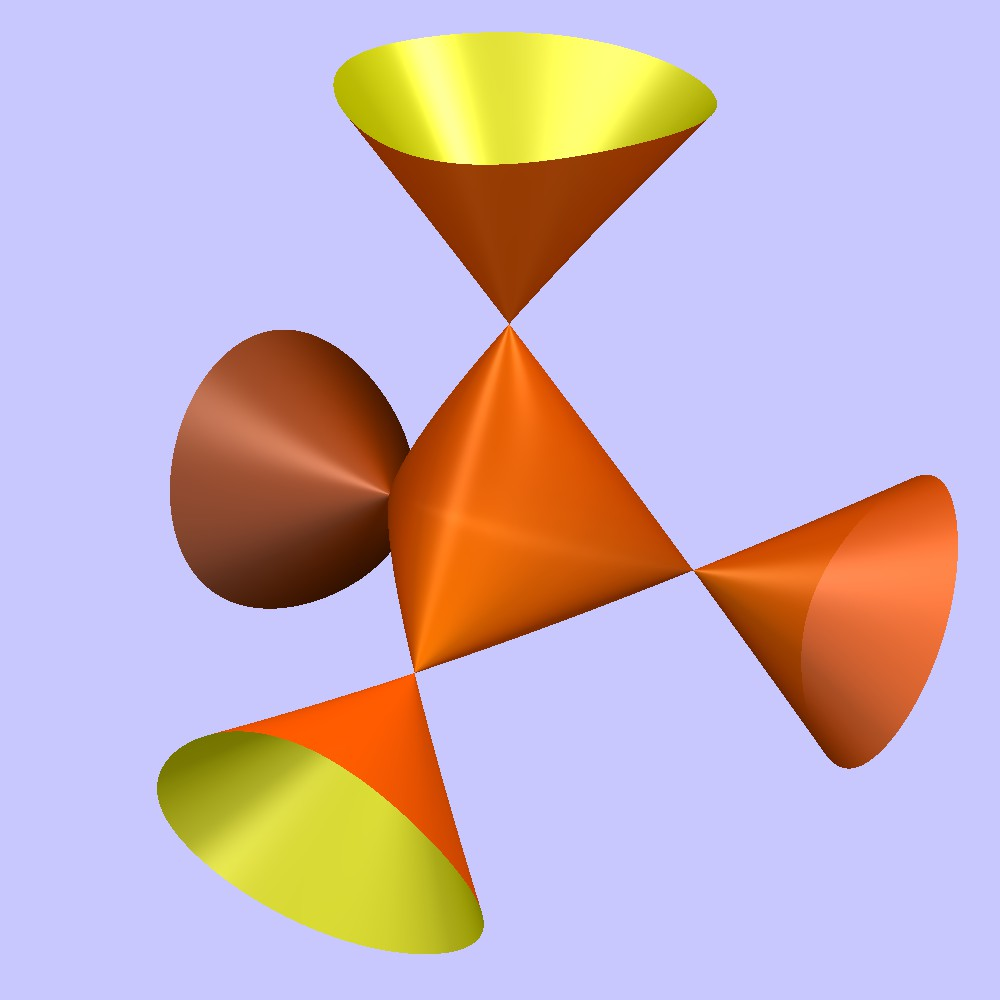
An algebraic surface with the simplest type of canonical singularity at 4 points: the surface node, also called the du Val singularity of type $A_1$.

Suppose, more strongly, that $f\colon Y \to X$ is a log resolution, meaning that Y is nonsingular and the exceptional locus of f is a divisor with simple normal crossings in Y. Then X is said to be

- Kawamata log terminal (klt) if $a_i>-1$ for all i,
- log canonical (lc) if $a_i\geq -1$ for all i.

These two properties are independent of the choice of log resolution. They were introduced in the early 1980s (with slightly different terminology) by Yujiro Kawamata.

If some log resolution of X has an exceptional divisor with discrepancy $a_i$ less than $-1$, then X has other log resolutions with arbitrarily negative discrepancies $a_j$. As a result, "log canonical" is the most general condition that can be defined along these lines, independent of the choice of log resolution.

== Explanation ==
These properties mean that the differential forms on X behave like those on a smooth variety, to a greater or lesser extent. When X is a smooth variety of dimension n over a field k, its canonical line bundle is defined as the sheaf of n-forms (or "volume forms") on X, $\omega_X:=\Omega^n_{X/k}$. For any morphism $f\colon Y \to X$ of smooth n-folds, there is a natural way to pull sections of $\omega_X$ back to sections of $\omega_Y$. In local coordinates, this pullback operation is given by the Jacobian determinant of f. When $f\colon Y \to X$ is a birational morphism of smooth varieties, the pullback of a section of $\omega_X$ vanishes along every exceptional divisor of f, because the Jacobian determinant vanishes there.

For a variety X over a perfect field which is normal but not smooth, the singular locus of X has codimension at least 2. The relevant sheaf of "volume forms", called the canonical sheaf $\omega_X$, is defined by: a section of $\omega_X$ on an open subset U of X is simply an n-form on the smooth locus of U. This sheaf need not be a line bundle (a locally free sheaf of rank 1) on X. (That is, at a singular point p in X, there may not be any open neighborhood U of p for which there is a nowhere-vanishing n-form on $U^{\text{smooth}}$.) But the condition that $K_X$ is $\mathbb Q$-Cartier, in the definition of "terminal" and so on, means that for some positive integer m, the mth tensor power line bundle $\omega_X^{\otimes m}$ on $X^{\text{smooth}}$ extends to a line bundle on X. The main part of the definition of "terminal" says that for a resolution of singularities $f\colon Y \to X$, each section of $\omega_X$ (on an open subset of X) pulls back to a section of $\omega_Y$ that vanishes on every exceptional divisor of f, and likewise for all positive multiples of $\omega_X$. Thus volume forms on a terminal variety behave "exactly like" those on a smooth variety.

Likewise, "canonical" means that sections of $\omega_X$ pull back to sections of $\omega_Y$, and likewise for positive multiples (but without being required to vanish on the exceptional divisors). "Klt" means that sections of $\omega_X$ pull back to sections of $\omega_Y$, without the same requirement for positive multiples of $\omega_X$. Finally, "log canonical" means that sections of $\omega_X$ pull back to rational sections of $\omega_Y$ that have at most a pole of order 1 along each exceptional divisor. (The word "log" comes primarily from the notion of logarithmic forms, which amounts to this "pole of order 1" condition. For example, $dx/x$ is a 1-form on the affine line with "log poles" at the origin.)

A direct consequence of the definition of canonical singularities is that if two projective varieties with canonical singularities are birational, then they have the same plurigenera, the dimensions of the vector spaces $H^0(X,O(mK_X))$ for all $m\geq 0$. By Caucher Birkar, Paolo Cascini, Christopher Hacon, and James McKernan, every smooth projective variety X of general type over a field of characteristic zero is birational to a unique projective variety with canonical singularities and ample canonical class, called the canonical model of X. Moreover, X is also birational to a projective variety (not in general unique) with terminal singularities and nef canonical class, called a minimal model of X. These are fundamental tools for the birational classification of algebraic varieties.

The motivation for defining terminal or canonical singularities was that they are the smallest classes of singularities for which minimal or canonical models can be expected to exist. But many techniques of the minimal model program turned out to work in the greater generality of klt or even log canonical singularities. As a result, one can say more by considering these broader classes of singularities. For example: the Kodaira vanishing theorem and the Cone theorem extend to projective log canonical varieties (and pairs, as discussed below) in characteristic zero. Or again: klt Fano varieties in characteristic zero are rationally connected.

== Examples ==
Terminal varieties of dimension at most 2 over a perfect field are smooth. (Over an arbitrary field, the correct statement is rather that terminal varieties of dimension at most 2 are regular schemes.) This explains why minimal models of surfaces can be taken to be smooth. More generally, the singular locus of any terminal variety has codimension at least 3. Therefore, terminal singularities in dimension 3 are isolated; over the complex numbers, they were classified by Shigefumi Mori (1985) and Reid. In particular, a terminal 3-fold singularity is the quotient of a hypersurface singularity with multiplicity 2 by a finite cyclic group. Some simple examples of terminal singularities in dimension 3 are the 3-fold node, $xy=zw$ in $A^4_{\mathbb{C}}$, and the quotient singularity $A^3_{\mathbb{C}}/\pm 1$.

Two-dimensional canonical singularities are also called du Val singularities. Over the complex numbers, they are locally analytically isomorphic to quotients of the affine plane $A^2_{\mathbb C}$ by finite subgroups of the special linear group $SL(2,{\mathbb C})$. In any dimension, quotient singularities $A^n_{\mathbb C}/G$ are canonical when G is a finite subgroup of $SL(n,{\mathbb C})$.

Two-dimensional klt singularities over $\mathbb C$ are locally analytically isomorphic to quotients of $A^2_{\mathbb C}$ by finite subgroups of the general linear group $GL(2,{\mathbb C})$. In any dimension, all quotient singularities $A^n_{\mathbb C}/G$ (with G a finite subgroup of $GL(n,{\mathbb C})$) are klt. For another example, toric varieties X with $K_X$ $\mathbb Q$-Cartier are klt.

Two-dimensional log canonical singularities were classified by Kawamata (1988): they are either simple elliptic, cusp, or smooth, divided by the action of a finite group. For example, the surface $x^d+y^d+z^d=0$ in $A^3_{\mathbb C}$ is terminal (in fact, smooth) for $d=1$, canonical (or also klt) for $d\leq 2$, and log canonical for $d\leq 3$. For $d=2$, this is the affine cone over a smooth conic curve in the projective plane ${\mathbf P}^2$ (called a surface node), which can also be viewed as the quotient $A^2_{\mathbb C}/\pm 1$. For $d=3$, this is the affine cone over an elliptic curve.

Generalizing the previous example, there is a clear description of these conditions for a cone singularity of any dimension. Let X be a smooth projective variety over a field, A an ample line bundle on X, and Y the affine cone over X with respect to A:

$$Y=\text{Spec} (\oplus_{m\geq 0}H^0(X,A^{\otimes m})).$$

Then

- Y is terminal if and only if A is $\mathbb Q$-linearly equivalent to $c(-K_X)$ for some rational number $0<c<1$;
- Y is canonical if and only if A is $\mathbb Q$-linearly equivalent to $c(-K_X)$ for some rational number $0<c\leq 1$;
- Y is klt if and only if A is $\mathbb Q$-linearly equivalent to $c(-K_X)$ for some rational number $c>0$;
- and Y is log canonical if and only if $-K_X$ is $\mathbb Q$-linearly equivalent to $bA$ for some rational number $b\geq 0$.

In particular, if Y is klt, then X must be a Fano variety, meaning that $-K_X$ is ample. If Y is log canonical, then X is either Fano or a Calabi-Yau variety, meaning that $K_X$ is $\mathbb Q$-linearly equivalent to zero. For example, a cone over an elliptic curve is log canonical but not klt, and a cone over a curve of genus at least 2 is not log canonical.

Another example: because the canonical bundle of the projective line $\mathbf{P}^1$ has degree $-2$, these results give that the affine cone over the rational normal curve of degree d in $\mathbf{P}^d$ is terminal (in fact, smooth) for $d=1$, canonical for $d\leq 2$, and klt for all positive integers d. (Over the complex numbers, these surface singularities can also be viewed as quotient singularities $A^2_{\mathbb C}/G$, with G the cyclic group of order d acting by scalars.)

For positive integers $a_1,\ldots,a_n$ with n at least 2, the hypersurface singularity $\{ x_1^{a_1}+\cdots+x_n^{a_n} =0 \}$ in $A^n_{\mathbb{C}}$ is canonical if and only if $\frac{1}{a_1}+\cdots+\frac{1}{a_n}>1$.

== Relation to rational singularities ==
These classes of singularities are closely related to the older notion of rational singularities. Assume here that the base field is the complex numbers $\mathbb{C}$. Then every klt variety X has rational singularities. In particular, X is Cohen-Macaulay. (These statements can fail for log canonical varieties. For example, an affine cone over an abelian surface is log canonical but not Cohen-Macaulay, and so it does not have rational singularities.)

Conversely, if $K_X$ is Cartier, then "canonical", "klt", and "rational singularities" are all equivalent, and they imply that X is Gorenstein. More generally, every klt variety X (in some neighborhood of a given point p) is the quotient by a finite cyclic group G of a canonical singularity Y with $K_Y$ Cartier, called the index-1 cover of X near p. Moreover, G acts freely in codimension 1 (meaning that it acts freely outside a closed subset of codimension at least 2 in Y). As a result, klt singularities over $\mathbb C$ are exactly the quotients of rational Gorenstein singularities by a cyclic group acting freely in codimension 1.

== Pairs ==
More generally, following Kawamata, these concepts can be defined for a pair (or log pair) $(X, \Delta)$. Namely, let X be a normal variety, and let $\Delta$ be a $\mathbb Q$-divisor on X (a finite linear combination of codimension-1 subvarieties with rational coefficients) such that $K_X + \Delta$ is $\mathbb Q$-Cartier. (The following properties depend on the specific $\mathbb Q$-divisor $\Delta$, not just on its linear equivalence class. More generally, the definitions work the same way for $\mathbb R$-divisors.) The basic idea is to think of a pair as a generalization of a variety, with the "canonical class" of the pair $(X,\Delta)$ being $K_X+\Delta$.

Let $f\colon Y \to X$ be a log resolution of $(X, \Delta)$, meaning that Y is nonsingular and the union of the exceptional locus of f with the strict transform of $\Delta$ is a divisor with simple normal crossings on Y. (The strict transform of a codimension-1 subvariety S of X (understood to be irreducible) is the unique codimension-1 subvariety of Y that maps onto S; this extends in the obvious way to a finite linear combination of subvarieties.) There is a well-defined $\mathbb Q$-divisor $\Gamma$ on Y such that

$$K_Y+\Gamma=f^*(K_X+\Delta).$$

(Here the strict transform of each component of $\Delta$ has the same coefficient in $\Gamma$ as in $\Delta$.) The pair $(X,\Delta)$ is called

- Kawamata log terminal (klt) if all coefficients of $\Gamma$ are $<1$,
- log canonical (lc) if all coefficients of $\Gamma$ are $\leq 1$.

These properties can also be defined without specifying a particular log resolution of $(X, \Delta)$. Namely, let $f\colon Y\to X$ be any proper birational morphism from a normal variety Y to X. There is a well-defined $\mathbb Q$-divisor $\Gamma$ on Y as above. For each codimension-1 subvariety E in Y, define the discrepancy of E with respect to $(X, \Delta)$ as the negative of the coefficient of E in $\Gamma$. Then $(X,\Delta)$ is said to be klt if every irreducible divisor E over X (that is, in every such variety Y) has discrepancy $>-1$. Likewise, $(X,\Delta)$ is log canonical if every irreducible divisor E over X has discrepancy $\geq -1$. (This agrees with the previous definitions if a log resolution exists, for example when the base field has characteristic zero. The definitions in this paragraph are the ones used when a log resolution is not known to exist, for example when the base field has positive characteristic and X has dimension greater than 3.)

Using this terminology, several related classes of pairs can be defined as follows. Namely, a pair $(X,\Delta)$ is

- terminal if $\Delta$ has coefficients $<1$ and every exceptional divisor over X has discrepancy $>0$ (with respect to $(X,\Delta)$),
- canonical if $\Delta$ has coefficients $\leq 1$ and every exceptional divisor over X has discrepancy $\geq 0$,
- purely log terminal (plt) if $\Delta$ has coefficients $\leq 1$ and every exceptional divisor over X has discrepancy $>-1$.

Here an exceptional divisor over $X$ means an irreducible divisor E in some normal variety $Y\to X$ as above such that the image of E in X has codimension at least 2. When $\Delta=0$, these definitions of "terminal" and "canonical" agree with those given above for varieties rather than pairs. When X has dimension at least 2, the assumption in these definitions about the coefficients of $\Delta$ can be omitted (it follows from the condition on exceptional divisors).

One last related class of pairs is: $(X,\Delta)$ is divisorial log terminal (dlt) if $\Delta$ has coefficients at most 1 and the discrepancy is $>-1$ for every exceptional divisor over X whose image in X is contained in the closed subset where the pair $(X,\Delta)$ does not have simple normal crossings. (Roughly speaking, this means that "dlt" is the smallest class of pairs that includes klt pairs as well as simple normal crossing pairs with coefficients at most 1.)

== Explanation ==
In dimension at least 2, if a pair $(X,\Delta)$ is not log canonical, meaning that some irreducible divisor over X has discrepancy less than $-1$, then there are irreducible divisors over X with arbitrarily negative discrepancies. That explains why "log canonical" is the most general condition that can be formulated along these lines for normal varieties. (There is a useful generalization of "log canonical" to non-normal schemes, "semi-log canonical" or "slc". For example, stable curves are slc.)

One practical reason for studying pairs is that many results of the minimal model program have been extended from varieties to pairs. For example, the Kodaira vanishing theorem and the Cone theorem hold for projective log canonical (or even slc) pairs $(X,\Delta)$ with $\Delta$ effective (that is, with coefficients $\geq 0$). Or again: for a dlt Fano pair $(X,\Delta)$ (meaning that X is projective, $-(K_X+\Delta)$ is ample, and $\Delta$ is effective), X is rationally connected. Thus, it may be possible to say more about a given variety X by finding a suitable $\Delta$.

Just as terminal and canonical singularities occur on minimal and canonical models of smooth projective varieties, dlt and log canonical pairs naturally arise as "minimal" or "log canonical" models of pairs $(X,D)$ with X smooth projective and D a simple normal crossing divisor with coefficients 1. One early motivation for studying such pairs was to classify smooth noncompact varieties, as far as possible. Indeed, every smooth quasi-projective variety over $\mathbb C$ can be written as $X-D$ for some smooth projective variety X and some divisor D with simple normal crossings. A given pair $(X,D)$ can then be simplified via the minimal model program.

Philosophically, the definition of terminal singularities (for example) already indicates that many properties of a variety X can be encoded in a resolution of singularities $f\colon Y \to X$ together with the $\mathbb Q$-divisor $\Delta$ such that $f^*(K_X)=K_Y+\Delta$. This suggests that pairs can be viewed as geometric objects comparable to varieties: for some purposes, X can be replaced by the pair $(Y,\Delta)$. One says that X is crepant birational to the pair $(Y,\Delta)$.

== Examples ==
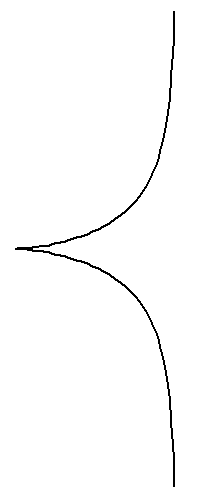
A cuspidal cubic curve

For pairs (as opposed to varieties), the most important conditions are "log canonical" and the various versions of "log terminal". These conditions measure the singularities of the variety X together with those of the $\mathbb Q$-divisor $\Delta$. Letting the coefficients of $\Delta$ vary gives a quantitative measure of how singular the components of $\Delta$ are. For example: for C the cuspidal cubic curve $y^2=x^3$ in the affine plane $A^2$, the pair $(A^2,bC)$ is klt if and only if $b<5/6$, and it is log canonical if and only if $b\leq 5/6$. That is, a cuspidal curve in a smooth surface has log canonical threshold $5/6$. (As this example suggests, lowering the coefficients always preserves "klt" and these other conditions on a pair $(X,\Delta)$, assuming that the property "$K_X+\Delta$ $\mathbb Q$-Cartier" remains true.)

For a simple case, let X be a smooth variety, and let $\Delta$ be a $\mathbb Q$-divisor on X whose support has simple normal crossings. (For example, X could be the affine plane $A^2$ and $\Delta$ could be the two coordinate axes, with a given rational coefficient on each axis.) Then the pair $(X,\Delta)$ is klt if and only if the coefficients of $\Delta$ are less than 1. Next, "dlt" and "log canonical" are both equivalent to the coefficients of $\Delta$ being at most 1. Finally, "plt" means that the coefficients of $\Delta$ are at most 1, and no two components with coefficient 1 meet. More generally, a pair $(X,\Delta)$ is plt if and only if it is dlt and no two components of $\Delta$ with coefficient 1 meet.

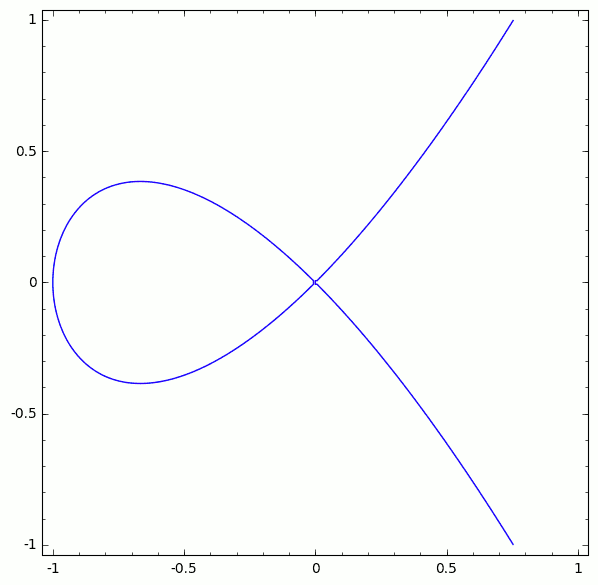
A nodal cubic curve

The "dlt" condition is local in the Zariski topology, but not in the classical topology over $\mathbb C$ (or in the étale topology, over a general field). For example, let C be the nodal cubic curve $y^2=x^2(x+1)$ in the affine plane $A^2$ over $\mathbb{C}$. Then the pair $(A^2,C)$ is log canonical but not dlt, even though the singular point of C is locally analytically isomorphic to the two coordinate axes in $A^2$. The point is that C has normal crossings but not simple normal crossings. The use of "simple normal crossings" in the definition makes dlt pairs easier to work with, while still being broad enough to include minimal models of simple normal crossing pairs.

== Properties ==
For a pair $(X,\Delta)$, the following implications hold:

$$\text{terminal} \implies \text{canonical} \implies \text{plt} \implies \text{dlt} \implies \text{lc}.$$

Also, "terminal" implies "klt" which implies "plt". A canonical pair need not be klt, as shown by the pair $(X,D)$ with X a smooth variety and D a smooth codimension-1 subvariety with coefficient 1.

The notion of "plt" is well-suited to arguments by induction on dimension. For example, let S be a subvariety locally defined by one equation in a normal variety X (so S is an irreducible Cartier divisor in X). Then the adjunction formula says that $K_S=(K_X+S)|_S$. As a result, one can hope to pass from information about the lower-dimensional variety S to information about the pair $(X,S)$. Thus it becomes natural to study pairs with coefficient 1, even if the goal is to prove things about varieties. A useful tool in such arguments is the theorem on inversion of adjunction. A simple version says: if S is Cartier in X and $K_X$ is $\mathbb Q$-Cartier, then the pair $(X,S)$ is plt on some open neighborhood of S if and only if S is klt.

An important consequence of the dlt condition (hence of all the stronger conditions) is: for a dlt pair $(X,\Delta)$ over a field of characteristic zero with $\Delta$ effective, X has rational singularities. This fails in general for log canonical pairs (and even log canonical varieties), as mentioned earlier.

A variety X is said to be of klt type if every point has a Zariski open neighborhood U that contains an effective $\mathbb Q$-divisor $\Delta$ such that the pair $(U,\Delta)$ is klt. (One reason for making this definition is that there may not be a natural choice of $\Delta$.) For example, every toric variety is of klt type. For another example, the affine cone Y over the Segre embedding $X={\mathbf P}^1\times {\mathbf P}^2\subset \mathbf{P}^5$, also known as the determinantal variety of $2\times 3$ matrices with rank at most 1, is of klt type but not klt. (Indeed, $K_Y$ is not $\mathbb Q$-Cartier, because $-K_X=O(2,3)$ is not a rational multiple of $O_{{\mathbf P}^5}(1)|_X=O(1,1)$ in the Picard group $\text{Pic}({\mathbf P}^1\times {\mathbf P}^2) \cong {\mathbb Z}^2$.) By the previous paragraph, klt type implies rational singularities in characteristic zero.

== See also ==
- Multiplier ideal
