= Ruled variety =

In algebraic geometry, a variety over a field $k$ is ruled if it is birational to the product of the projective line with some variety over $k$. A variety is uniruled if it is covered by a family of rational curves. (More precisely, a variety $X$ is uniruled if there is a variety $Y$ and a dominant rational map $Y\times \mathbf{P}^1 \to X$ which does not factor through the projection to $Y$.) The concept arose from the ruled surfaces of 19th-century geometry, meaning surfaces in affine space or projective space which are covered by lines. Uniruled varieties can be considered to be relatively simple among all varieties, although there are many of them.

== Properties ==
Every uniruled variety over a field of characteristic zero has Kodaira dimension −∞. The converse is a conjecture which is known in dimension at most 3: a variety of Kodaira dimension −∞ over a field of characteristic zero should be uniruled. A related statement is known in all dimensions: Boucksom, Demailly, Păun and Peternell showed that a smooth projective variety X over a field of characteristic zero is uniruled if and only if the canonical bundle of X is not pseudo-effective (that is, not in the closed convex cone spanned by effective divisors in the Néron-Severi group tensored with the real numbers). As a very special case, a smooth hypersurface of degree d in P^{n} over a field of characteristic zero is uniruled if and only if d ≤ n, by the adjunction formula. (In fact, a smooth hypersurface of degree d ≤ n in P^{n} is a Fano variety and hence is rationally connected, which is stronger than being uniruled.)

A variety X over an uncountable algebraically closed field k is uniruled if and only if there is a rational curve passing through every k-point of X. By contrast, there are varieties over the algebraic closure k of a finite field which are not uniruled but have a rational curve through every k-point. (The Kummer variety of any non-supersingular abelian surface over F̅_{p} with p odd has these properties.) It is not known whether varieties with these properties exist over the algebraic closure of the rational numbers.

Uniruledness is a geometric property (it is unchanged under field extensions), whereas ruledness is not. For example, the conic x^{2} + y^{2} + z^{2} = 0 in P^{2} over the real numbers R is uniruled but not ruled. (The associated curve over the complex numbers C is isomorphic to P^{1} and hence is ruled.) In the positive direction, every uniruled variety of dimension at most 2 over an algebraically closed field of characteristic zero is ruled. Smooth cubic 3-folds and smooth quartic 3-folds in P^{4} over C are uniruled but not ruled.

== Positive characteristic ==
Uniruledness behaves very differently in positive characteristic. In particular, there are uniruled (and even unirational) surfaces of general type: an example is the surface x^{p+1} + y^{p+1} + z^{p+1} + w^{p+1} = 0 in P^{3} over F̅_{p}, for any prime number p ≥ 5. So uniruledness does not imply that the Kodaira dimension is −∞ in positive characteristic.

A variety X is separably uniruled if there is a variety Y with a dominant separable rational map Y × P^{1} ⇢ X which does not factor through the projection to Y. ("Separable" means that the derivative is surjective at some point; this would be automatic for a dominant rational map in characteristic zero.) A separably uniruled variety has Kodaira dimension −∞. The converse is true in dimension 2, but not in higher dimensions. For example, there is a smooth projective 3-fold over F̅_{2} which has Kodaira dimension −∞ but is not separably uniruled. It is not known whether every smooth Fano variety in positive characteristic is separably uniruled.
