= Relative canonical model =

Complex manifolds in mathematics

In the mathematical field of algebraic geometry, the relative canonical model of a singular variety of a mathematical object where $X$ is a particular canonical variety that maps to $X$, which simplifies the structure.

== Description ==
The precise definition is:

If $f:Y\to X$ is a resolution define the adjunction sequence to be the sequence of subsheaves $f_*\omega_Y^{\otimes n};$ if $\omega_X$ is invertible $f_*\omega_Y^{\otimes n}=I_n\omega_X^{\otimes n}$ where $I_n$ is the higher adjunction ideal. Problem. Is $\oplus_n f_*\omega_Y^{\otimes n}$ finitely generated? If this is true then $Proj \oplus_n f_*\omega_Y^{\otimes n} \to X$ is called the relative canonical model of $Y$, or the canonical blow-up of $X$.

Some basic properties were as follows: The relative canonical model was independent of the choice of resolution. Some integer multiple $r$ of the canonical divisor of the relative canonical model was Cartier and the number of exceptional components where this agrees with the same multiple of the canonical divisor of Y is also independent of the choice of Y. When it equals the number of components of Y it was called crepant. It was not known whether relative canonical models were Cohen–Macaulay.

Because the relative canonical model is independent of $Y$, most authors simplify the terminology, referring to it as the relative canonical model of $X$ rather than either the relative canonical model of $Y$ or the canonical blow-up of $X$. The class of varieties that are relative canonical models have canonical singularities. Since that time in the 1970s other mathematicians solved affirmatively the problem of whether they are Cohen–Macaulay. The minimal model program started by Shigefumi Mori proved that the sheaf in the definition always is finitely generated and therefore that relative canonical models always exist.
