= Contraction morphism =

In algebraic geometry, a contraction morphism is a surjective projective morphism $f: X \to Y$ between normal projective varieties (or projective schemes) such that $f_* \mathcal{O}_X = \mathcal{O}_Y$ or, equivalently, the geometric fibers are all connected (Zariski's connectedness theorem). It is also commonly called an algebraic fiber space, as it is an analog of a fiber space in algebraic topology.

By the Stein factorization, any surjective projective morphism is a contraction morphism followed by a finite morphism.

Examples include ruled surfaces and Mori fiber spaces.

== Birational perspective ==
The following perspective is crucial in birational geometry (in particular in Mori's minimal model program).

Let $X$ be a projective variety and $\overline{NS}(X)$ the closure of the span of irreducible curves on $X$ in $N_1(X)$ = the real vector space of numerical equivalence classes of real 1-cycles on $X$. Given a face $F$ of $\overline{NS}(X)$, the contraction morphism associated to F, if it exists, is a contraction morphism $f: X \to Y$ to some projective variety $Y$ such that for each irreducible curve $C \subset X$, $f(C)$ is a point if and only if $[C] \in F$. The basic question is which face $F$ gives rise to such a contraction morphism (cf. cone theorem).

== See also ==
- Castelnuovo's contraction theorem
- Flip (mathematics)
