= Periodic table of shapes =

Project to classify Fano varieties

The periodic table of mathematical shapes is the popular name given to a project to classify Fano varieties. The project was devised by Professor Alessio Corti, from the Department of Mathematics at Imperial College London. It aims to categorise all three-, four- and five-dimensional shapes into a single table, analogous to the periodic table of chemical elements. It is meant to hold the equations that describe each shape and, through this, mathematicians and other scientists expect to develop a better understanding of the shapes’ geometric properties and relations.

The project has already won the Philip Leverhulme Prize—worth £70,000—from the Leverhulme Trust, and in 2019 a European Research Council grant. While it is estimated that 500 million shapes can be defined algebraically in four dimensions, they may be decomposable (in the sense of the minimal model program) into as few as a few thousand "building blocks".

== See also ==
- List of complex and algebraic surfaces
- List of surfaces
- Lists of shapes
- List of mathematical shapes
- List of two-dimensional geometric shapes
