= Rational singularity =

Concept in algebraic geometry

In mathematics, more particularly in the field of algebraic geometry, a scheme $X$ has rational singularities, if it is normal, of finite type over a field of characteristic zero, and there exists a proper birational map

$$f \colon Y \rightarrow X$$

from a regular scheme $Y$ such that the higher direct images of $f_*$ applied to $\mathcal{O}_Y$ are trivial. That is,

$R^i f_* \mathcal{O}_Y = 0$ for $i > 0$.

If there is one such resolution, then it follows that all resolutions share this property, since any two resolutions of singularities can be dominated by a third.

For surfaces, rational singularities were defined by (Artin 1966).

== Formulations ==
Alternately, one can say that $X$ has rational singularities if and only if the natural map in the derived category

$$\mathcal{O}_X \rightarrow R f_* \mathcal{O}_Y$$

is a quasi-isomorphism. Notice that this includes the statement that $\mathcal{O}_X \simeq f_* \mathcal{O}_Y$ and hence the assumption that $X$ is normal.

There are related notions in positive and mixed characteristic of

- pseudo-rational

and

- F-rational

Rational singularities are in particular Cohen-Macaulay, normal and Du Bois. They need not be Gorenstein or even Q-Gorenstein.

Log terminal singularities are rational.

== Examples ==
An example of a rational singularity is the singular point of the quadric cone

$$x^2 + y^2 + z^2 = 0. \,$$

Artin showed that the rational double points of algebraic surfaces are the Du Val singularities.

== See also ==
- Elliptic singularity
