= Abundance conjecture =

Concept in algebraic geometry,

In algebraic geometry, the abundance conjecture is a conjecture in birational geometry, more precisely in the minimal model program, stating that for every projective variety $X$ with Kawamata log terminal singularities over a field $k$ if the canonical bundle $K_X$ is nef, then $K_X$ is semi-ample, i.e. $mK_X$ is base-point free for some $m>0$. In particular, if abundance holds, then one is able to define a model $X\rightarrow Y=\mathrm{Proj}\bigoplus_{l\geqslant 0} H^0(X, lK_X).$

Important cases of the abundance conjecture have been proven by Caucher Birkar.
