= Alessio Corti =

Italian mathematician

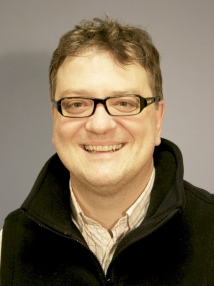
- Born: 25 September 1965 (age 61); Milan, Italy
- Education: University of Utah; University of Pisa
- Known for: Algebraic Geometry
- Awards: Junior Whitehead Prize (2002)
- Scientific career
- Fields: Mathematics
- Workplaces: Imperial College London; University of Cambridge; University of Chicago; Scuola Normale Superiore di Pisa
- Thesis: Families of Del Pezzo Surfaces (1992)
- Doctoral advisor: János Kollár; Fabrizio Catanese
- Doctoral students: Vladimir Lazić

Alessio Corti (born 1965) is a Professor of Mathematics at Imperial College London working in Algebraic Geometry.

Corti studied at the University of Pisa and Scuola Normale Superiore in Pisa, where he gained a diploma (Laurea) in 1987. He obtained his PhD in 1992 at the University of Utah under the supervision of János Kollár.

As a post-doctoral researcher, he was at the Scuola Normale Superiore in Pisa and at the Mathematical Sciences Research Institute in Berkeley, California. From 1993 to 1996 he was the Dickson Instructor at the University of Chicago and in 1996 became lecturer, later reader, of mathematics at the University of Cambridge. Since 2005 he has been a professor at Imperial College London. In 2002, he was awarded the London Mathematical Society's Whitehead Prize.

He is the originator of a project to create a periodic table of shapes.

He is married and has a daughter, Beatrice (born 17 September 1992).
