= Gino Fano =

Italian mathematician (1871–1952)

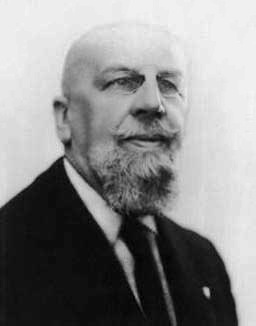
- Born: 5 January 1871; Mantua, Italy
- Died: 8 November 1952 (aged 81); Verona, Italy
- Education: University of Turin
- Known for: Fano postulate Fano plane Fano fibration Fano surface Fano varieties
- Scientific career
- Fields: Mathematics
- Workplaces: University of Turin; Sapienza University of Rome; University of Messina; Polytechnic University of Turin
- Academic advisors: Guido Castelnuovo, Felix Klein, Corrado Segre

Gino Fano (5 January 1871 – 8 November 1952) was an Italian mathematician, best known as the founder of finite geometry. He was born to a wealthy Jewish family in Mantua, in Italy and died in Verona, also in Italy.

Fano made various contributions to projective and algebraic geometry. His work in the foundations of geometry predates the similar, but more popular, work of David Hilbert by about a decade.

He was the father of physicist Ugo Fano and electrical engineer Robert Fano and uncle to physicist and mathematician Giulio Racah.

== Mathematical work ==
Fano was an early writer in the area of finite projective spaces. In his article on proving the independence of his set of axioms for projective n-space, among other things, he considered the consequences of having a fourth harmonic point be equal to its conjugate. This leads to a configuration of seven points and seven lines contained in a finite three-dimensional space with 15 points, 35 lines and 15 planes, in which each line contained only three points.

All the planes in this space consist of seven points and seven lines and are now known as Fano planes:

Fano Plane (7 points and 7 lines)

Fano went on to describe finite projective spaces of arbitrary dimension and prime orders.

In 1907, Gino Fano contributed two articles to Part III of Klein's encyclopedia. The first (SS. 221–88) was a comparison of analytic geometry and synthetic geometry through their historic development in the 19th century. The second (SS. 282–388) was on continuous groups in geometry and group theory as a unifying principle in geometry.

== World War II ==
Fano lost his university position in Italy in November 1938 due to the Racial Laws promulgated by Mussolini's government. He moved to Lausanne in Switzerland and remained there until 1945; though he gave some lectures during this period, he did not hold a formal university position in Switzerland.

== Sources ==
- Collino, Alberto; Conte, Alberto; Verra, Alessandro (2013). "On the life and scientific work of Gino Fano". arXiv:1311.7177 [math.HO].
- Grattan-Guinness, Ivor (2000). The Search for Mathematical Roots 1870–1940. Princeton University Press.
