= Discrepancy (algebraic geometry) =

In algebraic geometry, given a pair (X, D) consisting of a normal variety X and a $\mathbb{Q}$-divisor D on X (e.g., canonical divisor), the discrepancy of the pair (X, D) measures the degree of the singularity of the pair.

== See also ==
- Canonical singularity
- Crepant resolution
