= Elliptic singularity =

Type of surface singularity used in algebraic geometry

In algebraic geometry, an elliptic singularity of a surface, introduced by Philip Wagreich in 1970, is a surface singularity such that the arithmetic genus of its local ring is 1.

== See also ==
- Rational singularity
