= Flip (algebraic geometry) =

Surgery operation in minimal model program

In algebraic geometry, flips and flops are codimension-2 surgery operations arising in the minimal model program, given by blowing up along a relative canonical ring. In dimension 3 flips are used to construct minimal models, and any two birationally equivalent minimal models are connected by a sequence of flops. It is conjectured that the same is true in higher dimensions.

== The minimal model program ==
The minimal model program can be summarised very briefly as follows: given a variety $X$, we construct a sequence of contractions $X = X_1\rightarrow X_2 \rightarrow \cdots \rightarrow X_n$, each of which contracts some curves on which the canonical divisor $K_{X_i}$ is negative. Eventually, $K_{X_n}$ should become nef (at least in the case of nonnegative Kodaira dimension), which is the desired result. The major technical problem is that, at some stage, the variety $X_i$ may become 'too singular', in the sense that the canonical divisor $K_{X_i}$ is no longer a Cartier divisor, so the intersection number $K_{X_i} \cdot C$ with a curve $C$ is not even defined.

The (conjectural) solution to this problem is the flip. Given a problematic $X_i$ as above, the flip of $X_i$ is a birational map (in fact an isomorphism in codimension 1) $f\colon X_i \rightarrow X_i^+$ to a variety whose singularities are 'better' than those of $X_i$. So we can put $X_{i+1} = X_i^+$, and continue the process.

Two major problems concerning flips are to show that they exist and to show that one cannot have an infinite sequence of flips. If both of these problems can be solved, then the minimal model program can be carried out. The existence of flips for 3-folds was proved by Mori (1988). The existence of log flips, a more general kind of flip, in dimension three and four were proved by Shokurov (1993, 2003) whose work was fundamental to the solution of the existence of log flips and other problems in higher dimension. The existence of log flips in higher dimensions has been settled by (Caucher Birkar, Paolo Cascini & Christopher D. Hacon et al. 2010). On the other hand, the problem of termination—proving that there can be no infinite sequence of flips—is still open in dimensions greater than 3.

== Definition ==
If $f\colon X\to Y$ is a morphism, and K is the canonical bundle of X, then the relative canonical ring of f is

$$\bigoplus_m f_*(\mathcal{O}_X(mK))$$

and is a sheaf of graded algebras over the sheaf $\mathcal{O}_Y$ of regular functions on Y. The blowup

$$f^+\colon X^+= \operatorname{Proj}\big(\bigoplus_m f_*(\mathcal{O}_X(mK))\big)\to Y$$

of Y along the relative canonical ring is a morphism to Y. If the relative canonical ring is finitely generated (as an algebra over $\mathcal{O}_Y$ ) then the morphism $f^+$ is called the flip of $f$ if $-K$ is relatively ample, and the flop of $f$ if K is relatively trivial. (Sometimes the induced birational morphism from $X$ to $X^+$ is called a flip or flop.)

In applications, $f$ is often a small contraction of an extremal ray, which implies several extra properties:

- The exceptional sets of both maps $f$ and $f^+$ have codimension at least 2,
- $X$ and $X^+$ only have mild singularities, such as terminal singularities.
- $f$ and $f^+$ are birational morphisms onto Y, which is normal and projective.
- All curves in the fibers of $f$ and $f^+$ are numerically proportional.

== Examples ==
The first example of a flop, known as the Atiyah flop, was found in (Atiyah 1958). Let Y be the zeros of $xy=zw$ in $\mathbb{A}^4$, and let V be the blowup of Y at the origin. The exceptional locus of this blowup is isomorphic to $\mathbb{P}^1\times \mathbb{P}^1$, and can be blown down to $\mathbb{P}^1$ in two different ways, giving varieties $X_1$ and $X_2$. The natural birational map from $X_1$ to $X_2$ is the Atiyah flop.

Reid (1983) introduced Reid's pagoda, a generalization of Atiyah's flop replacing Y by the zeros of $xy = (z+w^k)(z-w^k)$.
