= Gorenstein scheme =

Algebraic geometry scheme

In algebraic geometry, a Gorenstein scheme is a locally Noetherian scheme whose local rings are all Gorenstein. The canonical line bundle is defined for any Gorenstein scheme over a field, and its properties are much the same as in the special case of smooth schemes.

== Related properties ==
For a Gorenstein scheme X of finite type over a field, f: X → Spec(k), the dualizing complex f^{!}(k) on X is a line bundle (called the canonical bundle K_{X}), viewed as a complex in degree −dim(X). If X is smooth of dimension n over k, the canonical bundle K_{X} can be identified with the line bundle Ω^{n} of top-degree differential forms.

Using the canonical bundle, Serre duality takes the same form for Gorenstein schemes as it does for smooth schemes.

Let X be a normal scheme of finite type over a field k. Then X is regular outside a closed subset of codimension at least 2. Let U be the open subset where X is regular; then the canonical bundle K_{U} is a line bundle. The restriction from the divisor class group Cl(X) to Cl(U) is an isomorphism, and (since U is smooth) Cl(U) can be identified with the Picard group Pic(U). As a result, K_{U} defines a linear equivalence class of Weil divisors on X. Any such divisor is called the canonical divisor K_{X}. For a normal scheme X, the canonical divisor K_{X} is said to be Q-Cartier if some positive multiple of the Weil divisor K_{X} is Cartier. (This property does not depend on the choice of Weil divisor in its linear equivalence class.) Alternatively, normal schemes X with K_{X} Q-Cartier are sometimes said to be Q-Gorenstein.

It is also useful to consider the normal schemes X for which the canonical divisor K_{X} is Cartier. Such a scheme is sometimes said to be Q-Gorenstein of index 1. (Some authors use "Gorenstein" for this property, but that can lead to confusion.) A normal scheme X is Gorenstein (as defined above) if and only if K_{X} is Cartier and X is Cohen–Macaulay.

== Examples ==
- An algebraic variety with local complete intersection singularities, for example any hypersurface in a smooth variety, is Gorenstein.
- A variety X with quotient singularities over a field of characteristic zero is Cohen–Macaulay, and K_{X} is Q-Cartier. The quotient variety of a vector space V by a linear action of a finite group G is Gorenstein if G maps into the subgroup SL(V) of linear transformations of determinant 1. By contrast, if X is the quotient of C^{2} by the cyclic group of order n acting by scalars, then K_{X} is not Cartier (and so X is not Gorenstein) for n ≥ 3.
- Generalizing the previous example, every variety X with klt (Kawamata log terminal) singularities over a field of characteristic zero is Cohen–Macaulay, and K_{X} is Q-Cartier.
- If a variety X has log canonical singularities, then K_{X} is Q-Cartier, but X need not be Cohen–Macaulay. For example, any affine cone X over an abelian variety Y is log canonical, and K_{X} is Cartier, but X is not Cohen–Macaulay when Y has dimension at least 2.
