= Rational variety =

Algebraic variety

In mathematics, a rational variety is an algebraic variety, over a given field K, which is birationally equivalent to a projective space of some dimension over K. This means that its function field is isomorphic to

$$K(U_1, \dots , U_d),$$

the field of all rational functions for some set $\{U_1, \dots, U_d\}$ of indeterminates, where d is the dimension of the variety.

== Rationality and parameterization ==
Let V be an affine algebraic variety of dimension d defined by a prime ideal I = ⟨f_{1}, ..., f_{k}⟩ in $K[X_1, \dots , X_n]$. If V is rational, then there are n + 1 polynomials g_{0}, ..., g_{n} in $K(U_1, \dots , U_d)$ such that $f_i(g_1/g_0, \ldots, g_n/g_0)=0.$ In other words, we have a rational parameterization $x_i=\frac{g_i}{g_0}(u_1,\ldots,u_d)$ of the variety.

Conversely, such a rational parameterization induces a field homomorphism of the field of functions of V into $K(U_1, \dots , U_d)$. But this homomorphism is not necessarily onto. If such a parameterization exists, the variety is said to be unirational. Lüroth's theorem (see below) implies that unirational curves are rational; Castelnuovo's theorem also implies this for characteristic zero surfaces.

== Rationality questions ==
A rationality question asks whether a given field extension is rational, in the sense of being (up to isomorphism) the function field of a rational variety; such field extensions are also described as purely transcendental. More precisely, the rationality question for the field extension $K \subset L$ is this: is $L$ isomorphic to a rational function field over $K$ in the number of indeterminates given by the transcendence degree?

There are several different variations of this question, arising from the way in which the fields $K$ and $L$ are constructed.

For example, let $K$ be a field, and let

$$\{y_1, \dots, y_n \}$$

be indeterminates over K and let L be the field generated over K by them. Consider a finite group $G$ permuting those indeterminates over K. By standard Galois theory, the set of fixed points of this group action is a subfield of $L$, typically denoted $L^G$. The rationality question for $K \subset L^G$ is called Noether's problem and asks if this field of fixed points is or is not a purely transcendental extension of K. In the paper (Noether 1918) on Galois theory she studied the problem of parameterizing the equations with given Galois group, which she reduced to "Noether's problem". (She first mentioned this problem in (Noether 1913) where she attributed the problem to E. Fischer.) She showed this was true for n = 2, 3, or 4. R. G. Swan (1969) found a counter-example to the Noether's problem, with n = 47 and G a cyclic group of order 47.

== Lüroth's theorem ==
A celebrated case is Lüroth's problem, which Jacob Lüroth solved in the nineteenth century. Lüroth's problem concerns subextensions L of K(X), the rational functions in the single indeterminate X. Any such field is either equal to K or is also rational, i.e. L = K(F) for some rational function F. In geometrical terms this states that a non-constant rational map from the projective line to a curve C can only occur when C also has genus 0. That fact can be read off geometrically from the Riemann–Hurwitz formula.

== Unirationality ==
A unirational variety V over a field K is one dominated by a rational variety, so that its function field K(V) lies in a pure transcendental field of finite type (which can be chosen to be of finite degree over K(V) if K is infinite). The solution of Lüroth's problem shows that for algebraic curves, rational and unirational are the same, and Castelnuovo's theorem implies that for complex surfaces unirational implies rational, because both are characterized by the vanishing of both the arithmetic genus and the second plurigenus. Zariski found some examples (Zariski surfaces) in characteristic p > 0 that are unirational but not rational. Clemens & Griffiths (1972) showed that a cubic three-fold is in general not a rational variety, providing an example for three dimensions that unirationality does not imply rationality. Their work used an intermediate Jacobian. Iskovskih & Manin (1971) showed that all non-singular quartic threefolds are irrational, though some of them are unirational. Artin & Mumford (1972) found some unirational 3-folds with non-trivial torsion in their third cohomology group, which implies that they are not rational.

For any field K, János Kollár proved in 2000 that a smooth cubic hypersurface of dimension at least 2 is unirational if it has a point defined over K. This is an improvement of many classical results, beginning with the case of cubic surfaces (which are rational varieties over an algebraic closure). Other examples of varieties that are shown to be unirational are many cases of the moduli space of curves.

== Rationally connected variety ==
A rationally connected variety V is a projective algebraic variety over an algebraically closed field such that through every two points there passes the image of a regular map from the projective line into V. Equivalently, a variety is rationally connected if every two points are connected by a rational curve contained in the variety.

This definition differs is analogous to path connectedness, but only using algebraic $\mathbb{P}^1$-paths, making it a much stronger condition: for example, the only algebraic curves which are rationally connected are the rational ones.

Every rational variety, including a projective space, is rationally connected, but the converse is false. The class of rationally connected varieties thus generalizes the rational varieties. Unirational varieties (see above) are rationally connected, but it is not known if the converse holds.

== Stably rational varieties ==
A variety V is called stably rational if $V \times \mathbf P^m$ is rational for some $m \ge 0$. Any rational variety is thus, by definition, stably rational. Examples constructed by Beauville et al. (1985) show, that the converse is false however.

Schreieder (2019) showed that very general hypersurfaces $V \subset \mathbf P^{N+1}$ are not stably rational, provided that the degree of V is at least $\log_2 N+2$.

== See also ==
- Rational curve
- Rational surface
- Ruled variety
- Severi–Brauer variety
- Birational geometry
