= Ample line bundle =

Concept in algebraic geometry

In mathematics, a distinctive feature of algebraic geometry is that some line bundles on a projective variety can be considered "positive", while others are "negative" (or a mixture of the two). The most important notion of positivity is that of an ample line bundle, although there are several related classes of line bundles. Roughly speaking, positivity properties of a line bundle are related to having many global sections. Understanding the ample line bundles on a given variety $X$ amounts to understanding the different ways of mapping $X$ into projective spaces. In view of the correspondence between line bundles and divisors (built from codimension-1 subvarieties), there is an equivalent notion of an ample divisor.

In more detail, a line bundle is called basepoint-free if it has enough sections to give a morphism to projective space. A line bundle is semi-ample if some positive power of it is basepoint-free; semi-ampleness is a kind of "nonnegativity". More strongly, a line bundle on a complete variety $X$ is very ample if it has enough sections to give a closed immersion (or "embedding") of $X$ into a projective space. A line bundle is ample if some positive power is very ample.

An ample line bundle on a projective variety $X$ has positive degree on every curve in $X$. The converse is not quite true, but there are corrected versions of the converse, the Nakai–Moishezon and Kleiman criteria for ampleness.

== Introduction ==
=== Pullback of a line bundle and hyperplane divisors ===
Given a morphism $f\colon X \to Y$ of schemes, a vector bundle $p \colon E \to Y$ (or more generally a coherent sheaf on $Y$) has a pullback to $X$, $f^*E = \{ (x,e) \in X \times E,\; f(x) = p(e) \}$ where the projection $p' \colon f^*E \to X$ is the projection on the first coordinate (see Sheaf of modules#Operations). The pullback of a vector bundle is a vector bundle of the same rank. In particular, the pullback of a line bundle is a line bundle. (Briefly, the fiber of $f^*E$ at a point $x\in X$ is the fiber of $E$ at $f(x)\in Y$.)

The notions described in this article are related to this construction in the case of a morphism to projective space

$$f\colon X \to \mathbb P^n,$$

with $E=\mathcal{O}(1)$ the line bundle on projective space whose global sections are the homogeneous polynomials of degree 1 (that is, linear functions) in variables $x_0,\ldots,x_n$. The line bundle $\mathcal{O}(1)$ can also be described as the line bundle associated to a hyperplane in $\mathbb P^n$ (because the zero set of a section of $\mathcal{O}(1)$ is a hyperplane). If $f$ is a closed immersion, for example, it follows that the pullback $f^*O(1)$ is the line bundle on $X$ associated to a hyperplane section (the intersection of $X$ with a hyperplane in $\mathbb{P}^n$).

=== Basepoint-free line bundles ===
Let $X$ be a scheme over a field $k$ (for example, an algebraic variety) with a line bundle $L$. (A line bundle may also be called an invertible sheaf.) Let $a_0,...,a_n$ be elements of the $k$-vector space $H^0(X,L)$ of global sections of $L$. The zero set of each section is a closed subset of $X$; let $U$ be the open subset of points at which at least one of $a_0,\ldots,a_n$ is not zero. Then these sections define a morphism

$$f\colon U\to \mathbb{P}^{n}_k,\ x \mapsto [a_0(x),\ldots,a_n(x)].$$

In more detail: for each point $x$ of $U$, the fiber of $L$ over $x$ is a 1-dimensional vector space over the residue field $k(x)$. Choosing a basis for this fiber makes $a_0(x),\ldots,a_n(x)$ into a sequence of $n+1$ numbers, not all zero, and hence a point in projective space. Changing the choice of basis scales all the numbers by the same nonzero constant, and so the point in projective space is independent of the choice.

Moreover, this morphism has the property that the restriction of $L$ to $U$ is isomorphic to the pullback $f^*\mathcal{O}(1)$.

The base locus of a line bundle $L$ on a scheme $X$ is the intersection of the zero sets of all global sections of $L$. A line bundle $L$ is called basepoint-free if its base locus is empty. That is, for every point $x$ of $X$ there is a global section of $L$ which is nonzero at $x$. If $X$ is proper over a field $k$, then the vector space $H^0(X,L)$ of global sections has finite dimension; the dimension is called $h^0(X,L)$. So a basepoint-free line bundle $L$ determines a morphism $f\colon X\to \mathbb{P}^n$ over $k$, where $n=h^0(X,L)-1$, given by choosing a basis for $H^0(X,L)$. Without making a choice, this can be described as the morphism

$$f\colon X\to \mathbb{P}(H^0(X,L))$$

from $X$ to the space of hyperplanes in $H^0(X,L)$, canonically associated to the basepoint-free line bundle $L$. This morphism has the property that $L$ is the pullback $f^*\mathcal{O}(1)$.

Conversely, for any morphism $f$ from a scheme $X$ to a projective space $\mathbb{P}^n$ over $k$, the pullback line bundle $f^*\mathcal{O}(1)$ is basepoint-free. Indeed, $\mathcal{O}(1)$ is basepoint-free on $\mathbb{P}^n$, because for every point $y$ in $\mathbb{P}^n$ there is a hyperplane not containing $y$. Therefore, for every point $x$ in $X$, there is a section $s$ of $\mathcal{O}(1)$ over $\mathbb{P}^n$ that is not zero at $f(x)$, and the pullback of $s$ is a global section of $f^*\mathcal{O}(1)$ that is not zero at $x$. In short, basepoint-free line bundles are exactly those that can be expressed as the pullback of $\mathcal{O}(1)$ by some morphism to a projective space.

=== Nef, globally generated, semi-ample ===
The degree of a line bundle L on a proper curve C over k is defined as the degree of the divisor (s) of any nonzero rational section s of L. The coefficients of this divisor are positive at points where s vanishes and negative where s has a pole. Therefore, any line bundle L on a curve C such that $H^0(C,L)\neq 0$ has nonnegative degree (because sections of L over C, as opposed to rational sections, have no poles). In particular, every basepoint-free line bundle on a curve has nonnegative degree. As a result, a basepoint-free line bundle L on any proper scheme X over a field is nef, meaning that L has nonnegative degree on every (irreducible) curve in X.

More generally, a sheaf F of $O_X$-modules on a scheme X is said to be globally generated if there is a set I of global sections $s_i\in H^0(X,F)$ such that the corresponding morphism

$$\bigoplus_{i\in I}O_X\to F$$

of sheaves is surjective. A line bundle is globally generated if and only if it is basepoint-free.

For example, every quasi-coherent sheaf on an affine scheme is globally generated. Analogously, in complex geometry, Cartan's theorem A says that every coherent sheaf on a Stein manifold is globally generated.

A line bundle L on a proper scheme over a field is semi-ample if there is a positive integer r such that the tensor power $L^{\otimes r}$ is basepoint-free. A semi-ample line bundle is nef (by the corresponding fact for basepoint-free line bundles).

=== Very ample line bundles ===
A line bundle $L$ on a proper scheme $X$ over a field $k$ is said to be very ample if it is basepoint-free and the associated morphism

$$f\colon X\to\mathbb{P}^n_k$$

is an immersion. Here $n=h^0(X,L)-1$. Equivalently, $L$ is very ample if $X$ can be embedded into a projective space of some dimension over $k$ in such a way that $L$ is the restriction of the line bundle $\mathcal{O}(1)$ to $X$. The latter definition is used to define very ampleness for a line bundle on a proper scheme over any commutative ring.

The name "very ample" was introduced by Alexander Grothendieck in 1961. Various names had been used earlier in the context of linear systems of divisors.

For a very ample line bundle $L$ on a proper scheme $X$ over a field with associated morphism $f$, the degree of $L$ on a curve $C$ in $X$ is the degree of $f(C)$ as a curve in $\mathbb{P}^n$. So $L$ has positive degree on every curve in $X$ (because every subvariety of projective space has positive degree).

== Definitions ==
=== Ample invertible sheaves on quasi-compact schemes ===
Ample line bundles are used most often on proper schemes, but they can be defined in much wider generality.

Let X be a scheme, and let $\mathcal{L}$ be an invertible sheaf on X. For each $x \in X$, let $\mathfrak{m}_x$ denote the ideal sheaf of the reduced subscheme supported only at x. For $s \in \Gamma(X, \mathcal{L})$, define
$$X_s = \{x \in X \colon s_x \not\in \mathfrak{m}_x\mathcal{L}_x\}.$$
Equivalently, if $\kappa(x)$ denotes the residue field at x (considered as a skyscraper sheaf supported at x), then
$$X_s = \{x \in X \colon \bar s_x \neq 0 \in \kappa(x) \otimes \mathcal{L}_x\},$$
where $\bar s_x$ is the image of s in the tensor product.

Fix $s \in \Gamma(X, \mathcal{L})$. For every s, the restriction $\mathcal{L}|_{X_s}$ is a free $\mathcal{O}_X$-module trivialized by the restriction of s, meaning the multiplication-by-s morphism $\mathcal{O}_{X_s} \to \mathcal{L}|_{X_s}$ is an isomorphism. The set $X_s$ is always open, and the inclusion morphism $X_s \to X$ is an affine morphism. Despite this, $X_s$ need not be an affine scheme. For example, if $s = 1 \in \Gamma(X, \mathcal{O}_X)$, then $X_s = X$ is open in itself and affine over itself but generally not affine.

Assume X is quasi-compact. Then $\mathcal{L}$ is ample if, for every $x \in X$, there exists an $n \ge 1$ and an $s \in \Gamma(X, \mathcal{L}^{\otimes n})$ such that $x \in X_s$ and $X_s$ is an affine scheme. For example, the trivial line bundle $\mathcal{O}_X$ is ample if and only if X is quasi-affine.

In general, it is not true that every $X_s$ is affine. For example, if $X = \mathbf{P}^2 \setminus \{O\}$ for some point O, and if $\mathcal{L}$ is the restriction of $\mathcal{O}_{\mathbf{P}^2}(1)$ to X, then $\mathcal{L}$ and $\mathcal{O}_{\mathbf{P}^2}(1)$ have the same global sections, and the non-vanishing locus of a section of $\mathcal{L}$ is affine if and only if the corresponding section of $\mathcal{O}_{\mathbf{P}^2}(1)$ contains O.

It is necessary to allow powers of $\mathcal{L}$ in the definition. In fact, for every N, it is possible that $X_s$ is non-affine for every $s \in \Gamma(X, \mathcal{L}^{\otimes n})$ with $n \le N$. Indeed, suppose Z is a finite set of points in $\mathbf{P}^2$, $X = \mathbf{P}^2 \setminus Z$, and $\mathcal{L} = \mathcal{O}_{\mathbf{P}^2}(1)|_X$. The vanishing loci of the sections of $\mathcal{L}^{\otimes N}$ are plane curves of degree N. By taking Z to be a sufficiently large set of points in general position, we may ensure that no plane curve of degree N (and hence any lower degree) contains all the points of Z. In particular their non-vanishing loci are all non-affine.

Define $\textstyle S = \bigoplus_{n \ge 0} \Gamma(X, \mathcal{L}^{\otimes n})$. Let $p \colon X \to \operatorname{Spec} \mathbf{Z}$ denote the structural morphism. There is a natural isomorphism between $\mathcal{O}_X$-algebra homomorphisms $\textstyle p^*(\tilde S) \to \bigoplus_{n \ge 0} \mathcal{L}^{\otimes n}$ and endomorphisms of the graded ring S. The identity endomorphism of S corresponds to a homomorphism $\varepsilon$. Applying the $\operatorname{Proj}$ functor produces a morphism from an open subscheme of X, denoted $G(\varepsilon)$, to $\operatorname{Proj} S$.

The basic characterization of ample invertible sheaves states that if X is a quasi-compact quasi-separated scheme and $\mathcal{L}$ is an invertible sheaf on X, then the following assertions are equivalent:

1. $\mathcal{L}$ is ample.
2. The open sets $X_s$, where $s \in \Gamma(X, \mathcal{L}^{\otimes n})$ and $n \ge 0$, form a basis for the topology of X.
3. The open sets $X_s$ with the property of being affine, where $s \in \Gamma(X, \mathcal{L}^{\otimes n})$ and $n \ge 0$, form a basis for the topology of X.
4. $G(\varepsilon) = X$ and the morphism $G(\varepsilon) \to \operatorname{Proj} S$ is a dominant open immersion.
5. $G(\varepsilon) = X$ and the morphism $G(\varepsilon) \to \operatorname{Proj} S$ is a homeomorphism of the underlying topological space of X with its image.
6. For every quasi-coherent sheaf $\mathcal{F}$ on X, the canonical map $\bigoplus_{n \ge 0} \Gamma(X, \mathcal{F} \otimes_{\mathcal{O}_X} \mathcal{L}^{\otimes n}) \otimes_{\mathbf{Z}} \mathcal{L}^{\otimes{-n}} \to \mathcal{F}$ is surjective.
7. For every quasi-coherent sheaf of ideals $\mathcal{J}$ on X, the canonical map $\bigoplus_{n \ge 0} \Gamma(X, \mathcal{J} \otimes_{\mathcal{O}_X} \mathcal{L}^{\otimes n}) \otimes_{\mathbf{Z}} \mathcal{L}^{\otimes{-n}} \to \mathcal{J}$ is surjective.
8. For every quasi-coherent sheaf $\mathcal{F}$ of finite type on X, there exists an integer $n_0$ such that for $n \ge n_0$, $\mathcal{F} \otimes \mathcal{L}^{\otimes n}$ is generated by its global sections.
9. For every quasi-coherent sheaf $\mathcal{F}$ of finite type on X, there exists integers $n > 0$ and $k > 0$ such that $\mathcal{F}$ is isomorphic to a quotient of $\mathcal{L}^{\otimes(-n)} \otimes \mathcal{O}_X^k$.
10. For every quasi-coherent sheaf of ideals $\mathcal{J}$ of finite type on X, there exists integers $n > 0$ and $k > 0$ such that $\mathcal{J}$ is isomorphic to a quotient of $\mathcal{L}^{\otimes(-n)} \otimes \mathcal{O}_X^k$.

=== On proper schemes ===
When X is separated and finite type over an affine scheme, an invertible sheaf $\mathcal{L}$ is ample if and only if there exists a positive integer r such that the tensor power $\mathcal{L}^{\otimes r}$ is very ample. In particular, a proper scheme over R has an ample line bundle if and only if it is projective over R. Often, this characterization is taken as the definition of ampleness.

The rest of this article will concentrate on ampleness on proper schemes over a field, as this is the most important case. An ample line bundle on a proper scheme X over a field has positive degree on every curve in X, by the corresponding statement for very ample line bundles.

A Cartier divisor D on a proper scheme X over a field k is said to be ample if the corresponding line bundle O(D) is ample. (For example, if X is smooth over k, then a Cartier divisor can be identified with a finite linear combination of closed codimension-1 subvarieties of X with integer coefficients.)

Weakening the notion of "very ample" to "ample" gives a flexible concept with a wide variety of different characterizations. A first point is that tensoring high powers of an ample line bundle with any coherent sheaf whatsoever gives a sheaf with many global sections. More precisely, a line bundle L on a proper scheme X over a field (or more generally over a Noetherian ring) is ample if and only if for every coherent sheaf F on X, there is an integer s such that the sheaf $F\otimes L^{\otimes r}$ is globally generated for all $r\geq s$. Here s may depend on F.

Another characterization of ampleness, known as the Cartan–Serre–Grothendieck theorem, is in terms of coherent sheaf cohomology. Namely, a line bundle L on a proper scheme X over a field (or more generally over a Noetherian ring) is ample if and only if for every coherent sheaf F on X, there is an integer s such that

$$H^i(X,F\otimes L^{\otimes r})=0$$

for all $i>0$ and all $r\geq s$. In particular, high powers of an ample line bundle kill cohomology in positive degrees. This implication is called the Serre vanishing theorem, proved by Jean-Pierre Serre in his 1955 paper Faisceaux algébriques cohérents.

== Examples/Non-examples ==
- The trivial line bundle $O_X$ on a projective variety X of positive dimension is basepoint-free but not ample. More generally, for any morphism f from a projective variety X to some projective space $\mathbb{P}^n$ over a field, the pullback line bundle $L=f^*O(1)$ is always basepoint-free, whereas L is ample if and only if the morphism f is finite (that is, all fibers of f have dimension 0 or are empty).
- For an integer d, the space of sections of the line bundle O(d) over $\mathbb{P}^1_{\C}$ is the complex vector space of homogeneous polynomials of degree d in variables x,y. In particular, this space is zero for d < 0. For $d\geq 0$, the morphism to projective space given by O(d) is

$$\mathbb{P}^1\to\mathbb{P}^{d}$$

by

$$[x,y]\mapsto [x^d,x^{d-1}y,\ldots,y^d].$$

This is a closed immersion for $d\geq 1$, with image a rational normal curve of degree d in $\mathbb{P}^d$. Therefore, O(d) is basepoint-free if and only if $d\geq 0$, and very ample if and only if $d\geq 1$. It follows that O(d) is ample if and only if $d\geq 1$.

- For an example where "ample" and "very ample" are different, let X be a smooth projective curve of genus 1 (an elliptic curve) over C, and let p be a complex point of X. Let O(p) be the associated line bundle of degree 1 on X. Then the complex vector space of global sections of O(p) has dimension 1, spanned by a section that vanishes at p. So the base locus of O(p) is equal to p. On the other hand, O(2p) is basepoint-free, and O(dp) is very ample for $d\geq 3$ (giving an embedding of X as an elliptic curve of degree d in $\mathbb{P}^{d-1}$). Therefore, O(p) is ample but not very ample. Also, O(2p) is ample and basepoint-free but not very ample; the associated morphism to projective space is a ramified double cover $X\to\mathbb{P}^1$.
- On curves of higher genus, there are ample line bundles L for which every global section is zero. (But high multiples of L have many sections, by definition.) For example, let X be a smooth plane quartic curve (of degree 4 in $\mathbb{P}^2$) over C, and let p and q be distinct complex points of X. Then the line bundle $L=O(2p-q)$ is ample but has $H^0(X,L)=0$.

== Criteria for ampleness of line bundles ==
=== Intersection theory ===
To determine whether a given line bundle on a projective variety X is ample, the following numerical criteria (in terms of intersection numbers) are often the most useful. It is equivalent to ask when a Cartier divisor D on X is ample, meaning that the associated line bundle O(D) is ample. The intersection number $D\cdot C$ can be defined as the degree of the line bundle O(D) restricted to C. In the other direction, for a line bundle L on a projective variety, the first Chern class $c_1(L)$ means the associated Cartier divisor (defined up to linear equivalence), the divisor of any nonzero rational section of L.

On a smooth projective curve X over an algebraically closed field k, a line bundle L is very ample if and only if $h^0(X,L\otimes O(-x-y))=h^0(X,L)-2$ for all k-rational points x,y in X. Let g be the genus of X. By the Riemann–Roch theorem, every line bundle of degree at least 2g + 1 satisfies this condition and hence is very ample. As a result, a line bundle on a curve is ample if and only if it has positive degree.

For example, the canonical bundle $K_X$ of a curve X has degree 2g − 2, and so it is ample if and only if $g\geq 2$. The curves with ample canonical bundle form an important class; for example, over the complex numbers, these are the curves with a metric of negative curvature. The canonical bundle is very ample if and only if $g\geq 2$ and the curve is not hyperelliptic.

The Nakai–Moishezon criterion (named for Yoshikazu Nakai (1963) and Boris Moishezon (1964)) states that a line bundle L on a proper scheme X over a field is ample if and only if $\int_Y c_1(L)^{\text{dim}(Y)}>0$ for every (irreducible) closed subvariety Y of X (Y is not allowed to be a point). In terms of divisors, a Cartier divisor D is ample if and only if $D^{\text{dim}(Y)}\cdot Y>0$ for every (nonzero-dimensional) subvariety Y of X. For X a curve, this says that a divisor is ample if and only if it has positive degree. For X a surface, the criterion says that a divisor D is ample if and only if its self-intersection number $D^2$ is positive and every curve C on X has $D\cdot C>0$.

=== Kleiman's criterion ===
To state Kleiman's criterion (1966), let X be a projective scheme over a field. Let $N_1(X)$ be the real vector space of 1-cycles (real linear combinations of curves in X) modulo numerical equivalence, meaning that two 1-cycles A and B are equal in $N_1(X)$ if and only if every line bundle has the same degree on A and on B. By the Néron–Severi theorem, the real vector space $N_1(X)$ has finite dimension. Kleiman's criterion states that a line bundle L on X is ample if and only if L has positive degree on every nonzero element C of the closure of the cone of curves NE(X) in $N_1(X)$. (This is slightly stronger than saying that L has positive degree on every curve.) Equivalently, a line bundle is ample if and only if its class in the dual vector space $N^1(X)$ is in the interior of the nef cone.

Kleiman's criterion fails in general for proper (rather than projective) schemes X over a field, although it holds if X is smooth or more generally Q-factorial.

A line bundle on a projective variety is called strictly nef if it has positive degree on every curve. Nagata (1959) and David Mumford constructed line bundles on smooth projective surfaces that are strictly nef but not ample. This shows that the condition $c_1(L)^2>0$ cannot be omitted in the Nakai–Moishezon criterion, and it is necessary to use the closure of NE(X) rather than NE(X) in Kleiman's criterion. Every nef line bundle on a surface has $c_1(L)^2\geq 0$, and Nagata and Mumford's examples have $c_1(L)^2=0$.

C. S. Seshadri showed that a line bundle L on a proper scheme over an algebraically closed field is ample if and only if there is a positive real number ε such that deg(L|_{C}) ≥ εm(C) for all (irreducible) curves C in X, where m(C) is the maximum of the multiplicities at the points of C.

Several characterizations of ampleness hold more generally for line bundles on a proper algebraic space over a field k. In particular, the Nakai-Moishezon criterion is valid in that generality. The Cartan-Serre-Grothendieck criterion holds even more generally, for a proper algebraic space over a Noetherian ring R. (If a proper algebraic space over R has an ample line bundle, then it is in fact a projective scheme over R.) Kleiman's criterion fails for proper algebraic spaces X over a field, even if X is smooth.

=== Openness of ampleness ===
On a projective scheme X over a field, Kleiman's criterion implies that ampleness is an open condition on the class of an R-divisor (an R-linear combination of Cartier divisors) in $N^1(X)$, with its topology based on the topology of the real numbers. (An R-divisor is defined to be ample if it can be written as a positive linear combination of ample Cartier divisors.) An elementary special case is: for an ample divisor H and any divisor E, there is a positive real number b such that $H+aE$ is ample for all real numbers a of absolute value less than b. In terms of divisors with integer coefficients (or line bundles), this means that nH + E is ample for all sufficiently large positive integers n.

Ampleness is also an open condition in a quite different sense, when the variety or line bundle is varied in an algebraic family. Namely, let $f\colon X\to Y$ be a proper morphism of schemes, and let L be a line bundle on X. Then the set of points y in Y such that L is ample on the fiber $X_y$ is open (in the Zariski topology). More strongly, if L is ample on one fiber $X_y$, then there is an affine open neighborhood U of y such that L is ample on $f^{-1}(U)$ over U.

=== Kleiman's other characterizations of ampleness ===
Kleiman also proved the following characterizations of ampleness, which can be viewed as intermediate steps between the definition of ampleness and numerical criteria. Namely, for a line bundle L on a proper scheme X over a field, the following are equivalent:

- L is ample.
- For every (irreducible) subvariety $Y\sub X$ of positive dimension, there is a positive integer r and a section $s\in H^0(Y,\mathcal L^{\otimes r})$ which is not identically zero but vanishes at some point of Y.
- For every (irreducible) subvariety $Y\sub X$ of positive dimension, the holomorphic Euler characteristics of powers of L on Y go to infinity:

$\chi(Y,\mathcal L^{\otimes r})\to\infty$ as $r\to \infty$.

== Generalizations ==
=== Ample vector bundles ===
Robin Hartshorne defined a vector bundle F on a projective scheme X over a field to be ample if the line bundle $\mathcal{O}(1)$ on the space $\mathbb{P}(F)$ of hyperplanes in F is ample.

Several properties of ample line bundles extend to ample vector bundles. For example, a vector bundle F is ample if and only if high symmetric powers of F kill the cohomology $H^i$ of coherent sheaves for all $i>0$. Also, the Chern class $c_r(F)$ of an ample vector bundle has positive degree on every r-dimensional subvariety of X, for $1\leq r\leq \text{rank}(F)$.

=== Big line bundles ===
A useful weakening of ampleness, notably in birational geometry, is the notion of a big line bundle. A line bundle L on a projective variety X of dimension n over a field is said to be big if there is a positive real number a and a positive integer $j_0$ such that $h^0(X,L^{\otimes j})\geq aj^n$ for all $j\geq j_0$. This is the maximum possible growth rate for the spaces of sections of powers of L, in the sense that for every line bundle L on X there is a positive number b with $h^0(X,L^{\otimes j})\leq bj^n$ for all j > 0.

There are several other characterizations of big line bundles. First, a line bundle is big if and only if there is a positive integer r such that the rational map from X to $\mathbb P(H^0(X,L^{\otimes r}))$ given by the sections of $L^{\otimes r}$ is birational onto its image. Also, a line bundle L is big if and only if it has a positive tensor power which is the tensor product of an ample line bundle A and an effective line bundle B (meaning that $H^0(X,B)\neq 0$). Finally, a line bundle is big if and only if its class in $N^1(X)$ is in the interior of the cone of effective divisors.

Bigness can be viewed as a birationally invariant analog of ampleness. For example, if $f\colon X\to Y$ is a dominant rational map between smooth projective varieties of the same dimension, then the pullback of a big line bundle on Y is big on X. (At first sight, the pullback is only a line bundle on the open subset of X where f is a morphism, but this extends uniquely to a line bundle on all of X.) For ample line bundles, one can only say that the pullback of an ample line bundle by a finite morphism is ample.

Example: Let X be the blow-up of the projective plane $\mathbb{P}^2$ at a point over the complex numbers. Let H be the pullback to X of a line on $\mathbb{P}^2$, and let E be the exceptional curve of the blow-up $\pi\colon X\to\mathbb{P}^2$. Then the divisor H + E is big but not ample (or even nef) on X, because

$$(H+E)\cdot E=E^2=-1<0.$$

This negativity also implies that the base locus of H + E (or of any positive multiple) contains the curve E. In fact, this base locus is equal to E.

== Relative ampleness ==
Given a quasi-compact morphism of schemes $f : X \to S$, an invertible sheaf L on X is said to be ample relative to f or f-ample if the following equivalent conditions are met:

1. For each open affine subset $U \subset S$, the restriction of L to $f^{-1}(U)$ is ample (in the usual sense).
2. f is quasi-separated and there is an open immersion $X \hookrightarrow \operatorname{Proj}_S(\mathcal{R}), \, \mathcal{R} := f_*\left( \bigoplus_0^{\infty} L^{\otimes n} \right)$ induced by the adjunction map:
  $$f^* \mathcal{R} \to \bigoplus_0^{\infty} L^{\otimes n}$$.
3. The condition 2. without "open".

The condition 2 says (roughly) that X can be openly compactified to a projective scheme with $\mathcal{O}(1)= L$ (not just to a proper scheme).

== See also ==
=== General algebraic geometry ===
- Algebraic geometry of projective spaces
- Fano variety: a variety whose canonical bundle is anti-ample
- Matsusaka's big theorem
- Divisorial scheme: a scheme admitting an ample family of line bundles

=== Ampleness in complex geometry ===
- Holomorphic vector bundle
- Kodaira embedding theorem: on a compact complex manifold, ampleness and positivity coincide.
- Kodaira vanishing theorem
- Lefschetz hyperplane theorem: an ample divisor in a complex projective variety X is topologically similar to X.

== Sources ==
- Fujino, Osamu (2005), "On the Kleiman-Mori cone", Proceedings of the Japan Academy, Series A, Mathematical Sciences, 81 (5): 80–84, arXiv:math/0501055, Bibcode:2005math......1055F, doi:10.3792/pjaa.81.80, MR 2143547
- Grothendieck, Alexandre; Dieudonné, Jean (1961), "Éléments de géométrie algébrique: II. Étude globale élémentaire de quelques classes de morphismes", Publications Mathématiques de l'IHÉS, 8, doi:10.1007/bf02699291, MR 0217084
- Hartshorne, Robin (1970), Ample Subvarieties of Algebraic Varieties, Lecture Notes in Mathematics, vol. 156, Berlin, Heidelberg: Springer-Verlag, doi:10.1007/BFb0067839, ISBN 978-3-540-05184-8, MR 0282977
- Hartshorne, Robin (1977), Algebraic Geometry, Berlin, New York: Springer-Verlag, ISBN 978-0-387-90244-9, MR 0463157
- Kleiman, Steven L. (1966), "Toward a numerical theory of ampleness", Annals of Mathematics, Second Series, 84 (3): 293–344, doi:10.2307/1970447, ISSN 0003-486X, JSTOR 1970447, MR 0206009
- Kollár, János (1990), "Projectivity of complete moduli", Journal of Differential Geometry, 32, doi:10.4310/jdg/1214445046, MR 1064874
- Kollár, János (1996), Rational curves on algebraic varieties, Berlin, Heidelberg: Springer-Verlag, doi:10.1007/978-3-662-03276-3, ISBN 978-3-642-08219-1, MR 1440180
- Lazarsfeld, Robert (2004), Positivity in algebraic geometry (2 vols.), Berlin: Springer-Verlag, doi:10.1007/978-3-642-18808-4, ISBN 3-540-22533-1, MR 2095471
- Nagata, Masayoshi (1959), "On the 14th problem of Hilbert", American Journal of Mathematics, 81 (3): 766–772, doi:10.2307/2372927, JSTOR 2372927, MR 0154867
- "Section 29.37 (01VG): Relatively ample sheaves—The Stacks project"
- Stacks Project, Tag 01AM
- Stacks Project, Tag 01PS
- Stacks Project, Tag 01QE
- Stacks Project, Tag 01VU
- Stacks Project, Tag 02NP
- Stacks Project, Tag 02O6
- Stacks Project, Tag 0D38
