= Nef line bundle =

Concept in algebraic geometry

In algebraic geometry, a line bundle on a projective variety is nef if it has nonnegative degree on every curve in the variety. The classes of nef line bundles are described by a convex cone, and the possible contractions of the variety correspond to certain faces of the nef cone. In view of the correspondence between line bundles and divisors (built from codimension-1 subvarieties), there is an equivalent notion of a nef divisor.

== Definition ==
More generally, a line bundle L on a proper scheme X over a field k is said to be nef if it has nonnegative degree on every (closed irreducible) curve in X. (The degree of a line bundle L on a proper curve C over k is the degree of the divisor (s) of any nonzero rational section s of L.) A line bundle may also be called an invertible sheaf.

The term "nef" was introduced by Miles Reid as a replacement for the older terms "arithmetically effective" (Zariski 1962, definition 7.6) and "numerically effective", as well as for the phrase "numerically eventually free". The older terms were misleading, in view of the examples below.

Every line bundle L on a proper curve C over k which has a global section that is not identically zero has nonnegative degree. As a result, a basepoint-free line bundle on a proper scheme X over k has nonnegative degree on every curve in X; that is, it is nef. More generally, a line bundle L is called semi-ample if some positive tensor power $L^{\otimes a}$ is basepoint-free. It follows that a semi-ample line bundle is nef. Semi-ample line bundles can be considered the main geometric source of nef line bundles, although the two concepts are not equivalent; see the examples below.

A Cartier divisor D on a proper scheme X over a field is said to be nef if the associated line bundle O(D) is nef on X. Equivalently, D is nef if the intersection number $D\cdot C$ is nonnegative for every curve C in X.

To go back from line bundles to divisors, the first Chern class is the isomorphism from the Picard group of line bundles on a variety X to the group of Cartier divisors modulo linear equivalence. Explicitly, the first Chern class $c_1(L)$ is the divisor (s) of any nonzero rational section s of L.

== The nef cone ==
To work with inequalities, it is convenient to consider R-divisors, meaning finite linear combinations of Cartier divisors with real coefficients. The R-divisors modulo numerical equivalence form a real vector space $N^1(X)$ of finite dimension, the Néron–Severi group tensored with the real numbers. (Explicitly: two R-divisors are said to be numerically equivalent if they have the same intersection number with all curves in X.) An R-divisor is called nef if it has nonnegative degree on every curve. The nef R-divisors form a closed convex cone in $N^1(X)$, the nef cone Nef(X).

The cone of curves is defined to be the convex cone of linear combinations of curves with nonnegative real coefficients in the real vector space $N_1(X)$ of 1-cycles modulo numerical equivalence. The vector spaces $N^1(X)$ and $N_1(X)$ are dual to each other by the intersection pairing, and the nef cone is (by definition) the dual cone of the cone of curves.

A significant problem in algebraic geometry is to analyze which line bundles are ample, since that amounts to describing the different ways a variety can be embedded into projective space. One answer is Kleiman's criterion (1966): for a projective scheme X over a field, a line bundle (or R-divisor) is ample if and only if its class in $N^1(X)$ lies in the interior of the nef cone. (An R-divisor is called ample if it can be written as a positive linear combination of ample Cartier divisors.) It follows from Kleiman's criterion that, for X projective, every nef R-divisor on X is a limit of ample R-divisors in $N^1(X)$. Indeed, for D nef and A ample, D + cA is ample for all real numbers c > 0.

== Metric definition of nef line bundles ==
Let X be a compact complex manifold with a fixed Hermitian metric, viewed as a positive (1,1)-form $\omega$. Following Jean-Pierre Demailly, Thomas Peternell and Michael Schneider, a holomorphic line bundle L on X is said to be nef if for every $\epsilon > 0$ there is a smooth Hermitian metric $h_\epsilon$ on L whose curvature satisfies $\Theta_{h_\epsilon}(L)\geq -\epsilon\omega$. When X is projective over C, this is equivalent to the previous definition (that L has nonnegative degree on all curves in X).

Even for X projective over C, a nef line bundle L need not have a Hermitian metric h with curvature $\Theta_h(L)\geq 0$, which explains the more complicated definition just given.

== Examples ==
- If X is a smooth projective surface and C is an (irreducible) curve in X with self-intersection number $C^2\geq 0$, then C is nef on X, because any two distinct curves on a surface have nonnegative intersection number. If $C^2<0$, then C is effective but not nef on X. For example, if X is the blow-up of a smooth projective surface Y at a point, then the exceptional curve E of the blow-up $\pi\colon X\to Y$ has $E^2=-1$.
- Every effective divisor on a flag manifold or abelian variety is nef, using that these varieties have a transitive action of a connected algebraic group.
- Every line bundle L of degree 0 on a smooth complex projective curve X is nef, but L is semi-ample if and only if L is torsion in the Picard group of X. For X of genus g at least 1, most line bundles of degree 0 are not torsion, using that the Jacobian of X is an abelian variety of dimension g.
- Every semi-ample line bundle is nef, but not every nef line bundle is even numerically equivalent to a semi-ample line bundle. For example, David Mumford constructed a line bundle L on a suitable ruled surface X such that L has positive degree on all curves, but the intersection number $c_1(L)^2$ is zero. It follows that L is nef, but no positive multiple of $c_1(L)$ is numerically equivalent to an effective divisor. In particular, the space of global sections $H^0(X,L^{\otimes a})$ is zero for all positive integers a.

== Contractions and the nef cone ==
A contraction of a normal projective variety X over a field k is a surjective morphism $f\colon X\to Y$ with Y a normal projective variety over k such that $f_*\mathcal{O}_X=\mathcal{O}_Y$. (The latter condition implies that f has connected fibers, and it is equivalent to f having connected fibers if k has characteristic zero.) A contraction is called a fibration if dim(Y) < dim(X). A contraction with dim(Y) = dim(X) is automatically a birational morphism. (For example, X could be the blow-up of a smooth projective surface Y at a point.)

A face F of a convex cone N means a convex subcone such that any two points of N whose sum is in F must themselves be in F. A contraction of X determines a face F of the nef cone of X, namely the intersection of Nef(X) with the pullback $f^*(N^1(Y))\subset N^1(X)$. Conversely, given the variety X, the face F of the nef cone determines the contraction $f\colon X\to Y$ up to isomorphism. Indeed, there is a semi-ample line bundle L on X whose class in $N^1(X)$ is in the interior of F (for example, take L to be the pullback to X of any ample line bundle on Y). Any such line bundle determines Y by the Proj construction:

$$Y=\text{Proj }\bigoplus_{a\geq 0}H^0(X,L^{\otimes a}).$$

To describe Y in geometric terms: a curve C in X maps to a point in Y if and only if L has degree zero on C.

As a result, there is a one-to-one correspondence between the contractions of X and some of the faces of the nef cone of X. (This correspondence can also be formulated dually, in terms of faces of the cone of curves.) Knowing which nef line bundles are semi-ample would determine which faces correspond to contractions. The cone theorem describes a significant class of faces that do correspond to contractions, and the abundance conjecture would give more.

Example: Let X be the blow-up of the complex projective plane $\mathbb{P}^2$ at a point p. Let H be the pullback to X of a line on $\mathbb{P}^2$, and let E be the exceptional curve of the blow-up $\pi\colon X\to\mathbb{P}^2$. Then X has Picard number 2, meaning that the real vector space $N^1(X)$ has dimension 2. By the geometry of convex cones of dimension 2, the nef cone must be spanned by two rays; explicitly, these are the rays spanned by H and H − E. In this example, both rays correspond to contractions of X: H gives the birational morphism $X\to\mathbb{P}^2$, and H − E gives a fibration $X\to\mathbb{P}^1$ with fibers isomorphic to $\mathbb{P}^1$ (corresponding to the lines in $\mathbb{P}^2$ through the point p). Since the nef cone of X has no other nontrivial faces, these are the only nontrivial contractions of X; that would be harder to see without the relation to convex cones.
