= Rational mapping =

Kind of partial function between algebraic varieties

In mathematics, in particular the subfield of algebraic geometry, a rational map or rational mapping is a kind of partial function between algebraic varieties. This article uses the convention that varieties are irreducible.

== Definition ==
Formally, a rational map $f \colon V \to W$ between two varieties is an equivalence class of pairs $(f_U, U)$ in which $f_U$ is a morphism of varieties from a non-empty open set $U\subset V$ to $W$, and two such pairs $(f_U, U)$ and $({f'}_{U'}, U')$ are considered equivalent if $f_U$ and ${f'}_{U'}$ coincide on the intersection $U \cap U'$ (this is, in particular, vacuously true if the intersection is empty, but since $V$ is assumed irreducible, this is impossible). The proof that this defines an equivalence relation relies on the following lemma:

- If two morphisms of varieties are equal on some non-empty open set, then they are equal.

== Dominant and birational maps ==
$f$ is said to be dominant if one (equivalently, every) representative $f_U$ in the equivalence class is a dominant morphism, i.e. has a dense image. Two arbitrary rational maps $f \colon V \to W, g \colon W \to X$ can not necessarily be composed, but if $f$ has dense image then they can: pick any representative pairs $(f_U, U), (g_Y, Y)$ and note that since $f_U(U)$ is dense in $W$ it must intersect $Y$, and so $f_U^{-1}(Y)$ is a nonempty open subset of $V$ (as a morphism is necessarily continuous). Then $g_Y \circ f_U$ is defined on this set, so we take $g \circ f$ to be the equivalence class containing the pair

$$(g_Y \circ f_U, f_U^{-1}(Y)).\$$

$f$ is said to be birational if there exists a rational map $g \colon W \to V$ which is its inverse, where the composition is taken in the above sense.

The importance of rational maps to algebraic geometry is in the connection between such maps and maps between the function fields of $V$ and $W$. By definition, a rational function is just a rational map whose range is the projective line. Composition of functions then allows us to "pull back" rational functions along a rational map, so that a single rational map $f \colon V \to W$ induces a homomorphism of fields $K(W) \to K(V)$. In particular, the following theorem is central: the functor from the category of projective varieties with dominant rational maps (over a fixed base field, for example $\mathbb{C}$) to the category of finitely generated field extensions of the base field with reverse inclusion of extensions as morphisms, which associates each variety to its function field and each map to the associated map of function fields, is an equivalence of categories.

== Examples ==
=== Rational maps of projective spaces ===
There is a rational map $\mathbb{P}^2 \to \mathbb{P}^1$ sending a ratio $[x:y:z] \mapsto [x:y]$. Since the point $[0:0:1]$ cannot have an image, this map is only rational, and not a morphism of varieties. More generally, there are rational maps $\mathbb{P}^m \to \mathbb{P}^n$ for $m > n$ sending an $m$-tuple to an $n$-tuple by forgetting the last coordinates.

=== Inclusions of open subvarieties ===
On a connected variety $X$, the inclusion of any open subvariety $i:U \to X$ is a birational equivalence since the two varieties have equivalent function fields. That is, every rational function $f: X \to \mathbb{P}^1$can be restricted to a rational function $U \to \mathbb{P}^1$ and conversely, a rational function $U \to \mathbb{P}^1$ defines a rational equivalence class $(U,f)$ on $X$. An excellent example of this phenomenon is the birational equivalence of $\mathbb{A}^n$ and $\mathbb{P}^n$, hence $K(\mathbb{P}^n) \cong k(x_1,\ldots, x_n)$.

=== Covering spaces on open subsets ===
Covering spaces on open subsets of a variety give ample examples of rational maps which are not birational. For example, Belyi's theorem states that every algebraic curve $C$ admits a map $f: C \to \mathbb{P}^1$ which ramifies at three points. Then, there is an associated covering space $C|_U \to U = \mathbb{P}^1-\{p_1,p_2,p_3\}$ which defines a dominant rational morphism which is not birational. Another class of examples come from hyperelliptic curves which are double covers of $\mathbb{P}^1$ ramified at a finite number of points. Another class of examples are given by a taking a hypersurface $X \subset \mathbb{P}^n$ and restricting a rational map $\mathbb{P}^n \to \mathbb{P}^{n-1}$ to $X$. This gives a ramified cover. For example, the cubic surface given by the vanishing locus $Z(x^3 + y^3 + z^3 + w^3)$ has a rational map to $\mathbb{P}^2$ sending $[x:y:z:w] \mapsto [x:y:z]$. This rational map can be expressed as the degree $3$ field extension
$$k(x,y,z) \to \frac{k(x,y,z)[w]}{(x^3 + y^3 + z^3 + w^3)}$$

=== Resolution of singularities ===
One of the canonical examples of a birational map is the resolution of singularities. Over a field of characteristic 0, every singular variety $X$ has an associated nonsingular variety $Y$ with a birational map $\pi: Y \to X$. This map has the property that it is an isomorphism on $U = X - \text{Sing}(X)$ and the fiber over $\text{Sing}(X)$ is a normal crossing divisor. For example, a nodal curve such as $C = Z(x^3 + y^3 + z^3 - xyz) \subset \mathbb{P}^2$ is birational to $\mathbb{P}^1$ since topologically it is an elliptic curve with one of the circles contracted. Then, the birational map is given by normalization.

=== Birational equivalence ===
Two varieties are said to be birationally equivalent if there exists a birational map between them; this theorem states that birational equivalence of varieties is identical to isomorphism of their function fields as extensions of the base field. This is somewhat more liberal than the notion of isomorphism of varieties (which requires a globally defined morphism to witness the isomorphism, not merely a rational map), in that there exist varieties which are birational but not isomorphic.

The usual example is that $\mathbb{P}^2_k$ is birational to the variety $X$ contained in $\mathbb{P}^3_k$ consisting of the set of projective points $[w : x : y : z]$ such that $xy - wz = 0$, but not isomorphic. Indeed, any two curves in $\mathbb{P}^2_k$ intersect, but the lines in $X$ defined by $w = x = 0$ and $y = z = 0$ cannot intersect since their intersection would have all coordinates zero. To compute the function field of $X$ we pass to an affine subset (which does not change the field, a manifestation of the fact that a rational map depends only on its behavior in any open subset of its domain) in which $w \neq 0$; in projective space this means we may take $w = 1$ and therefore identify this subset with the affine $xyz$-plane. There, the coordinate ring of $X$ is

$$A(X) = k[x,y,z]/(xy - z) \cong k[x,y]$$

via the map $p(x,y,z)+(xy - z)A(X) \mapsto p(x,y,xy)$. And the field of fractions of the latter is just $k(x,y)$, isomorphic to that of $\mathbb{P}^2_k$. Note that at no time did we actually produce a rational map, though tracing through the proof of the theorem it is possible to do so.

== See also ==
- Birational geometry
- Blowing up
- Function field of an algebraic variety
- Resolution of singularities
- Minimal model program
- Log structure
