= Fano variety =

Concept in algebraic geometry

In algebraic geometry, a Fano variety, introduced by Gino Fano (Fano 1934, 1942), is an algebraic variety that generalizes certain aspects of complete intersections of algebraic hypersurfaces whose sum of degrees is at most the total dimension of the ambient projective space. Such complete intersections have important applications in geometry and number theory, because they typically admit rational points, an elementary case of which is the Chevalley–Warning theorem. Fano varieties provide an abstract generalization of these basic examples for which rationality questions are often still tractable.

Formally, a Fano variety is a complete variety X whose anticanonical bundle K_{X}^{*} is ample. In this definition, one could assume that X is smooth over a field, but the minimal model program has also led to the study of Fano varieties with various types of singularities, such as terminal or klt singularities. Recently techniques in differential geometry have been applied to the study of Fano varieties over the complex numbers, and success has been found in constructing moduli spaces of Fano varieties and proving the existence of Kähler–Einstein metrics on them through the study of K-stability of Fano varieties.

== Examples ==
- The fundamental example of Fano varieties are the projective spaces: the anticanonical line bundle of P^{n} over a field k is O(n+1), which is very ample (over the complex numbers, its curvature is n+1 times the Fubini–Study symplectic form).
- Let D be a smooth codimension-1 subvariety in P^{n}. The adjunction formula implies that K_{D} = (K_{X} + D)|_{D} = (−(n+1)H + deg(D)H)|_{D}, where H is the class of a hyperplane. The hypersurface D is therefore Fano if and only if deg(D) < n+1.
- More generally, a smooth complete intersection of hypersurfaces in n-dimensional projective space is Fano if and only if the sum of their degrees is at most n.
- Weighted projective space P(a_{0},...,a_{n}) is a singular (klt) Fano variety. This is the projective scheme associated to a graded polynomial ring whose generators have degrees a_{0},...,a_{n}. If this is well formed, in the sense that no n of the numbers a have a common factor greater than 1, then any complete intersection of hypersurfaces such that the sum of their degrees is less than a_{0}+...+a_{n} is a Fano variety.
- Every projective variety in characteristic zero that is homogeneous under a linear algebraic group is Fano.

== Some properties ==
The existence of some ample line bundle on X is equivalent to X being a projective variety, so a Fano variety is always projective. For a Fano variety X over the complex numbers, the Kodaira vanishing theorem implies that the sheaf cohomology groups $H^j(X , \mathcal{O}_X)$ of the structure sheaf vanish for $j> 0$. In particular, the Todd genus $\chi (X, \mathcal{O})= \sum (-1)^j h^j(X , \mathcal{O}_X)$ automatically equals 1. The $j=1,2$ cases of this vanishing statement also tell us that the first Chern class induces an isomorphism $c_1: Pic(X)\to H^2(X, \mathbb{Z})$.

By Yau's solution of the Calabi conjecture, a smooth complex variety admits Kähler metrics of positive Ricci curvature if and only if it is Fano. Myers' theorem therefore tells us that the universal cover of a Fano manifold is compact, and so can only be a finite covering. However, we have just seen that the Todd genus of a Fano manifold must equal 1. Since this would also apply to the manifold's universal cover, and since the Todd genus is multiplicative under finite covers, it follows that any Fano manifold is simply connected.

A much easier fact is that every Fano variety has Kodaira dimension −∞.

Campana and Kollár–Miyaoka–Mori showed that a smooth Fano variety over an algebraically closed field is rationally chain connected; that is, any two closed points can be connected by a chain of rational curves. Kollár–Miyaoka–Mori also showed that the smooth Fano varieties of a given dimension over an algebraically closed field of characteristic zero form a bounded family, meaning that they are classified by the points of finitely many algebraic varieties. In particular, there are only finitely many deformation classes of Fano varieties of each dimension. In this sense, Fano varieties are much more special than other classes of varieties such as varieties of general type.

== Classification in small dimensions ==
The following discussion concerns smooth Fano varieties over the complex numbers.

A Fano curve is isomorphic to the projective line.

A Fano surface is also called a del Pezzo surface. Every del Pezzo surface is isomorphic to either P^{1} × P^{1} or to the projective plane blown up in at most eight points, which must be in general position. As a result, they are all rational.

In dimension 3, there are smooth complex Fano varieties which are not rational, for example cubic 3-folds in P^{4} (by Clemens - Griffiths) and quartic 3-folds in P^{4} (by Iskovskikh - Manin). Iskovskih (1977, 1978, 1979) classified the smooth Fano 3-folds with second Betti number 1 into 17 classes, and Mori & Mukai (1981) classified the smooth ones with second Betti number at least 2, finding 88 deformation classes. A detailed summary of the classification of smooth Fano 3-folds is given in Iskovskikh & Prokhorov (1999).

== See also ==
- Periodic table of shapes a project to classify all Fano varieties in three, four and five dimensions.
