= Canonical ring =

In mathematics, the pluricanonical ring of an algebraic variety V (which is nonsingular), or of a complex manifold, is the graded ring

$$R(V,K)=R(V,K_V) \,$$

of sections of powers of the canonical bundle K. Its nth graded component (for $n\geq 0$) is:

$$R_n := H^0(V, K^n),\$$

that is, the space of sections of the n-th tensor product K^{n} of the canonical bundle K.

The 0th graded component $R_0$ is sections of the trivial bundle, and is one-dimensional as V is projective. The projective variety defined by this graded ring is called the canonical model of V, and the dimension of the canonical model is called the Kodaira dimension of V.

One can define an analogous ring for any line bundle L over V; the analogous dimension is called the Iitaka dimension. A line bundle is called big if the Iitaka dimension equals the dimension of the variety.

== Properties ==
=== Birational invariance ===
The canonical ring and therefore likewise the Kodaira dimension is a birational invariant: Any birational map between smooth compact complex manifolds induces an isomorphism between the respective canonical rings. As a consequence one can define the Kodaira dimension of a singular space as the Kodaira dimension of a desingularization. Due to the birational invariance this is well defined, i.e., independent of the choice of the desingularization.

=== Fundamental conjecture of birational geometry ===
A basic conjecture is that the pluricanonical ring is finitely generated. This is considered a major step in the Mori program. Caucher Birkar, Paolo Cascini, and Christopher D. Hacon et al. (2010) proved this conjecture.

== The plurigenera ==
The dimension

$$P_n = h^0(V, K^n) = \operatorname{dim}\ H^0(V, K^n)$$

is the classically defined n-th plurigenus of V. The pluricanonical divisor $K^n$, via the corresponding linear system of divisors, gives a map to projective space $\mathbf{P}(H^0(V, K^n)) = \mathbf{P}^{P_n - 1}$, called the n-canonical map.

The size of R is a basic invariant of V, and is called the Kodaira dimension.
