= Minimal model program =

Effort to birationally classify algebraic varieties

In algebraic geometry, the minimal model program is part of the birational classification of algebraic varieties. Its goal is to construct a birational model of any complex projective variety which is as simple as possible. The subject has its origins in the classical birational geometry of surfaces studied by the Italian school, and is currently an active research area within algebraic geometry.

== Outline ==
The basic idea of the theory is to simplify the birational classification of varieties by finding, in each birational equivalence class, a variety which is "as simple as possible". The precise meaning of this phrase has evolved with the development of the subject; originally for surfaces, it meant finding a smooth variety $X$ for which any birational morphism $f\colon X \to X'$ with a smooth surface $X'$ is an isomorphism.

In the modern formulation, the goal of the theory is as follows. Suppose we are given a projective variety $X$, which for simplicity is assumed non-singular. There are two cases based on its Kodaira dimension, $\kappa(X)$:

- $\kappa(X)=-\infty.$ We want to find a variety $X'$ birational to $X$, and a morphism $f\colon X' \to Y$ to a projective variety $Y$ such that $\dim Y < \dim X',$ with the anticanonical class $-K_F$ of a general fibre $F$ being ample. Such a morphism is called a Fano fibre space.
- $\kappa(X) \geqslant 0.$ We want to find $X'$ birational to $X$, with the canonical class $K_{X^\prime}$ nef. In this case, $X'$ is a minimal model for $X$.

The question of whether the varieties $X'$ and $X$ appearing above are non-singular is an important one. It seems natural to hope that if we start with smooth $X$, then we can always find a minimal model or Fano fibre space inside the category of smooth varieties. However, this is not true, and so it becomes necessary to consider singular varieties also. The singularities that appear are called terminal singularities.

== Minimal models of surfaces ==
Every irreducible complex algebraic curve is birational to a unique smooth projective curve, so the theory for curves is trivial. The case of surfaces was first investigated by the geometers of the Italian school around 1900; the contraction theorem of Guido Castelnuovo essentially describes the process of constructing a minimal model of any smooth projective surface. The theorem states that any nontrivial birational morphism $f\colon X\to Y$ must contract a −1-curve to a smooth point, and conversely any such curve can be smoothly contracted. Here a −1-curve is a smooth rational curve C with self-intersection $C\cdot C = -1.$ Any such curve must have $K\cdot C = -1$ which shows that if the canonical class is nef then the surface has no −1-curves.

Castelnuovo's theorem implies that to construct a minimal model for a smooth surface, we simply contract all the −1-curves on the surface, and the resulting variety Y is either a (unique) minimal model with K nef, or a ruled surface (which is the same as a 2-dimensional Fano fiber space, and is either a projective plane or a ruled surface over a curve). In the second case, the ruled surface birational to X is not unique, though there is a unique one isomorphic to the product of the projective line and a curve. A somewhat subtle point is that even though a surface might have infinitely many -1-curves, one need only contract finitely many of them to obtain a surface with no -1-curves.

== Higher-dimensional minimal models ==
In dimensions greater than 2, the theory becomes far more involved. In particular, there exist smooth varieties $X$ which are not birational to any smooth variety $X'$ with nef canonical class. The major conceptual advance of the 1970s and early 1980s was that the construction of minimal models is still feasible, provided one is careful about the types of singularities which occur. (For example, we want to decide if $K_{X'}$ is nef, so intersection numbers $K_{X'} \cdot C$ must be defined. Hence, at the very least, our varieties must have $nK_{X'}$ to be a Cartier divisor for some positive integer $n$.)

The first key result is the cone theorem of Shigefumi Mori, describing the structure of the cone of curves of $X$. Briefly, the theorem shows that starting with $X$, one can inductively construct a sequence of varieties $X_i$, each of which is "closer" than the previous one to having $K_{X_i}$ nef. However, the process may encounter difficulties: at some point the variety $X_i$ may become "too singular". The conjectural solution to this problem is the flip, a kind of codimension-2 surgery operation on $X_i$. It is not clear that the required flips exist, nor that they always terminate (that is, that one reaches a minimal model $X'$ in finitely many steps). Mori (1988) showed that flips exist in the 3-dimensional case.

The existence of the more general log flips was established by Vyacheslav Shokurov in dimensions three and four. This was subsequently generalized to higher dimensions by Caucher Birkar, Paolo Cascini, Christopher Hacon, and James McKernan relying on earlier work of Shokurov and Hacon, and McKernan. They also proved several other problems including finite generation of log canonical rings and existence of minimal models for varieties of log general type.

The problem of termination of log flips in higher dimensions remains the subject of active research.

== See also ==
- Abundance conjecture
- Minimal rational surface
