= János Kollár =

Hungarian mathematician

- Born: 7 June 1956 (age 70); Budapest
- Education: Brandeis University; Eötvös University
- Awards: Cole Prize (2006); Nemmers Prize in Mathematics (2016); Shaw Prize (2017)
- Scientific career
- Fields: Mathematics
- Workplaces: Princeton University; University of Utah
- Doctoral advisor: Teruhisa Matsusaka
- Doctoral students: Carolina Araujo; Alessio Corti; Chenyang Xu

János Kollár (born 7 June 1956) is a Hungarian mathematician, specializing in algebraic geometry.

== Professional career ==
Kollár began his studies at the Eötvös University in Budapest and later received his PhD at Brandeis University in 1984 under the direction of Teruhisa Matsusaka with a thesis on canonical threefolds. He was Junior Fellow at Harvard University from 1984 to 1987 and professor at the University of Utah from 1987 until 1999. Currently, he is professor at Princeton University.

== Contributions ==
Kollár is known for his contributions to the minimal model program for threefolds and hence the compactification of moduli of algebraic surfaces, for pioneering the notion of rational connectedness (i.e. extending the theory of rationally connected varieties for varieties over the complex field to varieties over local fields), and finding counterexamples to a conjecture of John Nash. (In 1952 Nash conjectured a converse to a famous theorem he proved, and Kollár was able to provide many 3-dimensional counterexamples from an important new structure theory for a class of 3-dimensional algebraic varieties.)

Kollár also gave the first algebraic proof of effective Nullstellensatz: let $f_1,\ldots,f_m$ be polynomials of degree at most $d \ge 3$ in $n\ge 2$ variables; if they have no common zero, then the equation $g_1 f_1+\cdots +g_m f_m=1$ has a solution such that each polynomial $g_j$ has degree at most $d^n - d$.

== Awards and honors ==
Kollár is a member of the National Academy of Sciences since 2005 and received the Cole Prize in 2006. He is an external member of the Hungarian Academy of Sciences since 1995. In 2012 he became a fellow of the American Mathematical Society. In 2016 he became a fellow of the American Academy of Arts and Sciences. In 2017 he received the Shaw Prize in Mathematical Sciences. In 2025 Kollar was awarded the Bolyai Prize by the Hungarian Academy of Sciences.

In 1990 he was an invited speaker at the International Congress of Mathematicians (ICM) in Kyōto. In 1996 he gave one of the plenary addresses at the European Mathematical Congress in Budapest (Low degree polynomial equations: arithmetic, geometry and topology). He was also selected as a plenary speaker at the 2014 ICM in Seoul.

As a high school student, Kollár represented Hungary and won Gold medals at both the 1973 and 1974 International Mathematical Olympiads.

== Works ==
- Kollár, János (1995). Shafarevich maps and automorphic forms. Princeton, New Jersey. ISBN 978-1-4008-6419-5. OCLC 889251457.
- Kollár, János (1996). Rational curves on algebraic varieties. Berlin: Springer. ISBN 3-540-60168-6. OCLC 33243194.
- Kollár, János; Mori, Shigefumi; Clemens, C. Herbert (1998). Birational geometry of algebraic varieties. Cambridge: Cambridge University Press. ISBN 0-521-63277-3. OCLC 39147883. (Japanese by Iwanami Shoten).
- Kollár, János (31 December 2009). Lectures on Resolution of Singularities (AM-166). Princeton University Press. doi:10.1515/9781400827800. ISBN 978-1-4008-2780-0.
- Kollár, János; Kovács, Sándor (21 February 2013). Singularities of the Minimal Model Program. Cambridge University Press. doi:10.1017/cbo9781139547895. ISBN 978-1-107-03534-8.
