= Christopher Hacon =

British mathematician

Christopher Hacon FRS
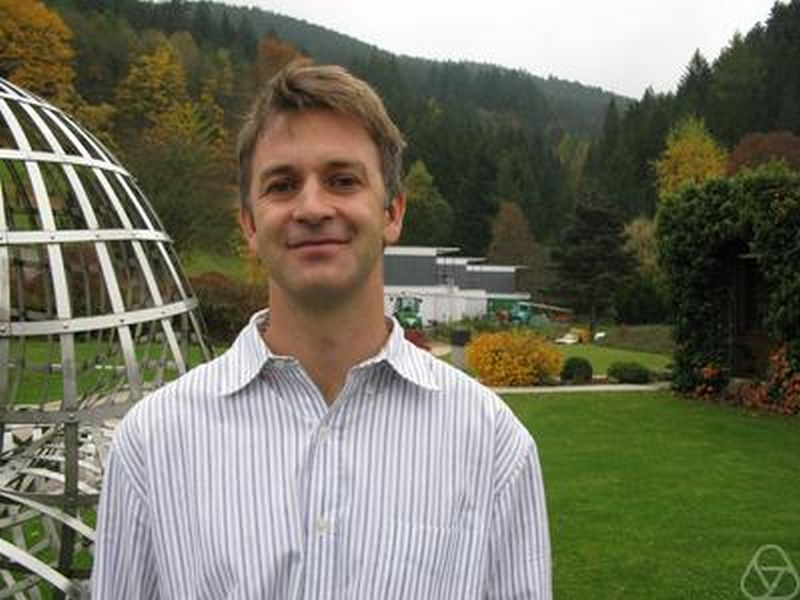
- Hacon at Oberwolfach in 2008
- Born: Christopher Derek Hacon; 14 February 1970 (age 56); Manchester, England
- Education: University of California, Los Angeles
- Spouse: Aleksandra Jovanovic-Hacon
- Children: Stefan Jovanovic-Hacon, Ana Jovanovic-Hacon, Aleksandar (Sasha) Jovanovic-Hacon, Kristina Jovanovic-Hacon, Daniela Jovanovic-Hacon, Marko Jovanovic-Hacon
- Awards: Clay Research Award (2007); Cole Prize (2009); Feltrinelli Prize (2011); Breakthrough Prize (2018)
- Scientific career
- Fields: Mathematics
- Workplaces: University of Utah
- Thesis: Seshadri Constants of Ample Vector Bundles Divisors on Principally Polarized Abelian Varieties (1998)
- Doctoral advisor: Robert Lazarsfeld

Christopher Derek Hacon (born 14 February 1970) is a mathematician with British, Italian and US nationalities. He is currently distinguished professor of mathematics at the University of Utah where he holds a Presidential Endowed Chair. His research interests include algebraic geometry.

Hacon was born in Manchester, but grew up in Italy where he studied at the Scuola Normale Superiore and received a degree in mathematics at the University of Pisa in 1992. He received his doctorate from the University of California, Los Angeles in 1998, under supervision of Robert Lazarsfeld.

== Awards and honors ==
In 2007, he was awarded a Clay Research Award for his work, joint with James McKernan, on "the birational geometry of algebraic varieties in dimension greater than three, in particular, for [an] inductive proof of the existence of flips."

In 2009, he was awarded the Cole Prize for outstanding contribution to algebra, along with McKernan.

He was an invited speaker at the International Congress of Mathematicians 2010 in Hyderabad, on the topic of "Algebraic Geometry."

In 2011, he was awarded the Antonio Feltrinelli Prize in Mathematics, Mechanics and Applications by Italy's prestigious Accademia Nazionale dei Lincei.

In 2012, he became a fellow of the American Mathematical Society.

In 2012, he became a Simons Investigator.

In 2015, he won the American Mathematical Society Moore Prize.

In 2017, he was elected to the American Academy of Arts and Sciences.

In 2017, he won the 2018 Breakthrough Prize in Mathematics (with James McKernan).

In 2018, he was elected to the National Academy of Sciences.

In 2019, he was elected to the Royal Society.
