= James McKernan =

British mathematician (born 1964)

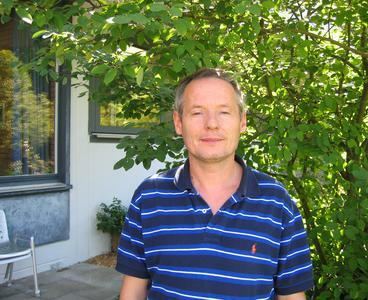
- McKernan in 2006
- Born: 19 March 1964 (age 62); London, England, UK
- Education: Harvard University; Trinity College, Cambridge
- Awards: Cole Prize (2009); Clay Research Award (2007); Breakthrough Prize (2018)
- Scientific career
- Fields: Mathematics
- Workplaces: MIT; University of California, Santa Barbara; University of California, San Diego
- Doctoral advisor: Joe Harris

James McKernan (born 1964) is a mathematician, and a professor of mathematics at the University of California, San Diego. He was a professor at the Massachusetts Institute of Technology from 2007 until 2013.

== Education ==
McKernan was educated at The Campion School and Trinity College, Cambridge, before going on to earn his Ph.D. from Harvard University in 1991. His dissertation, On the Hyperplane Sections of a Variety in Projective Space, was supervised by Joe Harris.

== Recognition ==
McKernan was the joint winner of the Cole Prize in 2009, and joint recipient of the Clay Research Award in 2007. Both honors were received jointly with his colleague Christopher Hacon. He gave an invited talk at the International Congress of Mathematicians in 2010, on the topic of "Algebraic Geometry". He was the joint winner (with Christopher Hacon) of the 2018 Breakthrough Prize in Mathematics.

He was elected as a Fellow of the American Mathematical Society in the 2020 Class, for "contributions to algebraic geometry, in particular his proof of the finite generation of the canonical ring, the existence of flips and the boundedness of varieties of log general type".
