= Birational geometry =

Field of algebraic geometry

The circle is birationally equivalent to the line. One birational map between them is stereographic projection, pictured here.

In mathematics, birational geometry is a field of algebraic geometry in which the goal is to determine when two algebraic varieties are isomorphic outside lower-dimensional subsets. This amounts to studying mappings that are given by rational functions rather than polynomials; the map may fail to be defined where the rational functions have poles.

== Birational maps ==
=== Rational maps ===
A rational map from one variety (understood to be irreducible) $X$ to another variety $Y$, written as a dashed arrow X ⇢Y, is defined as a morphism from a nonempty open subset $U \subset X$ to $Y$. By definition of the Zariski topology used in algebraic geometry, a nonempty open subset $U$ is always dense in $X$, in fact the complement of a lower-dimensional subset. Concretely, a rational map can be written in coordinates using rational functions.

=== Birational maps ===
A birational map from X to Y is a rational map f : X ⇢ Y such that there is a rational map Y ⇢ X inverse to f. A birational map induces an isomorphism from a nonempty open subset of X to a nonempty open subset of Y, and vice versa: an isomorphism between nonempty open subsets of X, Y by definition gives a birational map f : X ⇢ Y. In this case, X and Y are said to be birational, or birationally equivalent. In algebraic terms, two varieties over a field k are birational if and only if their function fields are isomorphic as extension fields of k.

A special case is a birational morphism f : X → Y, meaning a morphism which is birational. That is, f is defined everywhere, but its inverse may not be. Typically, this happens because a birational morphism contracts some subvarieties of X to points in Y.

=== Birational equivalence and rationality ===
A variety X is said to be rational if it is birational to affine space (or equivalently, to projective space) of some dimension. Rationality is a very natural property: it means that X minus some lower-dimensional subset can be identified with affine space minus some lower-dimensional subset.

==== Birational equivalence of a plane conic ====
For example, the circle $X$ with equation $x^2 + y^2 - 1 = 0$ in the affine plane is a rational curve, because there is a rational map f : $\mathbb{A}^1$ ⇢ X given by
$$f(t) = \left( \frac{2t}{1+t^2}, \frac{1 - t^2}{1 + t^2}\right),$$
which has a rational inverse g: X ⇢ $\mathbb{A}^1$ given by
$$g(x,y) = \frac{1-y}{x}.$$
Applying the map f with t a rational number gives a systematic construction of Pythagorean triples.

The rational map $f$ is not defined on the locus where $1 + t^2 = 0$. So, on the complex affine line $\mathbb{A}^1_{\Complex}$, $f$ is a morphism on the open subset $U = \mathbb{A}^1_{\Complex}-\{i, -i\}$, $f: U \to X$. Likewise, the rational map g : X ⇢ $\mathbb{A}^1$ is not defined at the point (0,−1) in $X$.

==== Birational equivalence of smooth quadrics and P^{n} ====
More generally, a smooth quadric (degree 2) hypersurface X of any dimension n is rational, by stereographic projection. (For X a quadric over a field k, X must be assumed to have a k-rational point; this is automatic if k is algebraically closed.) To define stereographic projection, let p be a point in X. Then a birational map from X to the projective space $\mathbb{P}^n$ of lines through p is given by sending a point q in X to the line through p and q. This is a birational equivalence but not an isomorphism of varieties, because it fails to be defined where q = p (and the inverse map fails to be defined at those lines through p which are contained in X).

===== Birational equivalence of quadric surface =====
The Segre embedding gives an embedding $\mathbb{P}^1\times\mathbb{P}^1 \to \mathbb{P}^3$ given by
$$([x,y],[z,w]) \mapsto [xz,xw,yz,yw].$$
The image is the quadric surface $x_0x_3=x_1x_2$ in $\mathbb{P}^3$. That gives another proof that this quadric surface is rational, since $\mathbb{P}^1\times\mathbb{P}^1$ is obviously rational, having an open subset isomorphic to $\mathbb{A}^2$.

== Minimal models and resolution of singularities ==
Every algebraic variety is birational to a projective variety (Chow's lemma). So, for the purposes of birational classification, it is enough to work only with projective varieties, and this is usually the most convenient setting.

Much deeper is Hironaka's 1964 theorem on resolution of singularities: over a field of characteristic 0 (such as the complex numbers), every variety is birational to a smooth projective variety. Given that, it is enough to classify smooth projective varieties up to birational equivalence.

In dimension 1, if two smooth projective curves are birational, then they are isomorphic. But that fails in dimension at least 2, by the blowing up construction. By blowing up, every smooth projective variety of dimension at least 2 is birational to infinitely many "bigger" varieties, for example with bigger Betti numbers.

This leads to the idea of minimal models: is there a unique simplest variety in each birational equivalence class? The modern definition is that a projective variety X is minimal if the canonical line bundle K_{X} has nonnegative degree on every curve in X; in other words, K_{X} is nef. It is easy to check that blown-up varieties are never minimal.

This notion works perfectly for algebraic surfaces (varieties of dimension 2). In modern terms, one central result of the Italian school of algebraic geometry from 1890–1910, part of the classification of surfaces, is that every surface X is birational either to a product $\mathbb{P}^1\times C$ for some curve C or to a minimal surface Y. The two cases are mutually exclusive, and Y is unique if it exists. When Y exists, it is called the minimal model of X.

== Birational invariants ==
At first, it is not clear how to show that there are any algebraic varieties which are not rational. In order to prove this, some birational invariants of algebraic varieties are needed. A birational invariant is any kind of number, ring, etc which is the same, or isomorphic, for all varieties that are birationally equivalent.

=== Plurigenera ===
One useful set of birational invariants are the plurigenera. The canonical bundle of a smooth variety X of dimension n means the line bundle of n-forms K_{X} = Ω^{n}, which is the nth exterior power of the cotangent bundle of X. For an integer d, the dth tensor power of K_{X} is again a line bundle. For d ≥ 0, the vector space of global sections H^{0}(X, K_{X}^{d}) has the remarkable property that a birational map f : X ⇢ Y between smooth projective varieties induces an isomorphism H^{0}(X, K_{X}^{d}) ≅ H^{0}(Y, K_{Y}^{d}).

For d ≥ 0, define the dth plurigenus P_{d} as the dimension of the vector space H^{0}(X, K_{X}^{d}); then the plurigenera are birational invariants for smooth projective varieties. In particular, if any plurigenus P_{d} with d > 0 is not zero, then X is not rational.

=== Kodaira dimension ===
A fundamental birational invariant is the Kodaira dimension, which measures the growth of the plurigenera P_{d} as d goes to infinity. The Kodaira dimension divides all varieties of dimension n into n + 2 types, with Kodaira dimension −∞, 0, 1, ..., or n. This is a measure of the complexity of a variety, with projective space having Kodaira dimension −∞. The most complicated varieties are those with Kodaira dimension equal to their dimension n, called varieties of general type.

=== Summands of ⊗^{k}Ω^{1} and some Hodge numbers ===
More generally, for any natural summand

$$E(\Omega^1) = \bigotimes^k \Omega^1$$

of the r-th tensor power of the cotangent bundle Ω^{1} with r ≥ 0, the vector space of global sections H^{0}(X, E(Ω^{1})) is a birational invariant for smooth projective varieties. In particular, the Hodge numbers

$$h^{p,0} = H^0(X,\Omega^p)$$

are birational invariants of X. (Most other Hodge numbers h^{p,q} are not birational invariants, as shown by blowing up.)

=== Fundamental group of smooth projective varieties ===
The fundamental group π_{1}(X) is a birational invariant for smooth complex projective varieties.

The "Weak factorization theorem", proved by Abramovich, Karu, Matsuki, and Włodarczyk (2002), says that any birational map between two smooth complex projective varieties can be decomposed into finitely many blow-ups or blow-downs of smooth subvarieties. This is important to know, but it can still be very hard to determine whether two smooth projective varieties are birational.

== Minimal models in higher dimensions ==
A projective variety X is called minimal if the canonical bundle K_{X} is nef. For X of dimension 2, it is enough to consider smooth varieties in this definition. In dimensions at least 3, minimal varieties must be allowed to have certain mild singularities, for which K_{X} is still well-behaved; these are called terminal singularities.

That being said, the minimal model conjecture would imply that every variety X is either covered by rational curves or birational to a minimal variety Y. When it exists, Y is called a minimal model of X.

Minimal models are not unique in dimensions at least 3, but any two minimal varieties which are birational are very close. For example, they are isomorphic outside subsets of codimension at least 2, and more precisely they are related by a sequence of flops. So the minimal model conjecture would give strong information about the birational classification of algebraic varieties.

The conjecture was proved in dimension 3 by Mori. There has been great progress in higher dimensions, although the general problem remains open. In particular, Birkar, Cascini, Hacon, and McKernan (2010) proved that every variety of general type over a field of characteristic zero has a minimal model.

== Uniruled varieties ==
A variety is called uniruled if it is covered by rational curves. A uniruled variety does not have a minimal model, but there is a good substitute: Birkar, Cascini, Hacon, and McKernan showed that every uniruled variety over a field of characteristic zero is birational to a Fano fiber space. (Note: Birkar et al. (2010, Corollary 1.3.3), implies that every uniruled variety in characteristic zero is birational to a Fano fiber space, using the easier result that a uniruled variety X is covered by a family of curves on which K_{X} has negative degree. A reference for the latter fact is Debarre (2001, Corollary 4.11) and Example 4.7(1).) This leads to the problem of the birational classification of Fano fiber spaces and (as the most interesting special case) Fano varieties. By definition, a projective variety X is Fano if the anticanonical bundle $K_X^*$ is ample. Fano varieties can be considered the algebraic varieties which are most similar to projective space.

In dimension 2, every Fano variety (known as a Del Pezzo surface) over an algebraically closed field is rational. A major discovery in the 1970s was that starting in dimension 3, there are many Fano varieties which are not rational. In particular, smooth cubic 3-folds are not rational by Clemens–Griffiths (1972), and smooth quartic 3-folds are not rational by Iskovskikh–Manin (1971). Nonetheless, the problem of determining exactly which Fano varieties are rational is far from solved. For example, it is not known whether there is any smooth cubic hypersurface in $\mathbb{P}^{n+1}$ with n ≥ 4 which is not rational.

== Birational automorphism groups ==
Algebraic varieties differ widely in how many birational automorphisms they have. Every variety of general type is extremely rigid, in the sense that its birational automorphism group is finite. At the other extreme, the birational automorphism group of projective space $\mathbb{P}^n$ over a field k, known as the Cremona group Cr_{n}(k), is large (in a sense, infinite-dimensional) for n ≥ 2. For n = 2, the complex Cremona group $Cr_2(\Complex)$ is generated by the "quadratic transformation"

[x,y,z] ↦ [1/x, 1/y, 1/z]

together with the group $PGL(3,\Complex)$ of automorphisms of $\mathbb{P}^2,$ by Max Noether and Castelnuovo. By contrast, the Cremona group in dimensions n ≥ 3 is very much a mystery: no explicit set of generators is known.

Iskovskikh–Manin (1971) showed that the birational automorphism group of a smooth quartic 3-fold is equal to its automorphism group, which is finite. In this sense, quartic 3-folds are far from being rational, since the birational automorphism group of a rational variety is enormous. This phenomenon of "birational rigidity" has since been discovered in many other Fano fiber spaces.

== Applications ==
Birational geometry has found applications in other areas of geometry, but especially in traditional problems in algebraic geometry.

Famously the minimal model program was used to construct moduli spaces of varieties of general type by János Kollár and Nicholas Shepherd-Barron, now known as KSB moduli spaces.

Birational geometry has recently found important applications in the study of K-stability of Fano varieties through general existence results for Kähler–Einstein metrics, in the development of explicit invariants of Fano varieties to test K-stability by computing on birational models, and in the construction of moduli spaces of Fano varieties. Important results in birational geometry such as Birkar's proof of boundedness of Fano varieties have been used to prove existence results for moduli spaces.

== See also ==
- Abundance conjecture
