= Segre embedding =

Map in projective geometry

In mathematics, the Segre embedding is a map used in projective geometry to consider the cartesian product of two projective spaces as a projective variety. It is named after Corrado Segre.

== Definition ==
We write $\mathbb{P}^n$ for $n$-dimensional projective space (over some field). The Segre embedding is defined as the map $\sigma: \mathbb{P}^n \times \mathbb{P}^m \to \mathbb{P}^{(n+1)(m+1)-1}\$given in homogeneous coordinates by

$$\sigma([X_0:X_1:\cdots:X_n], [Y_0:Y_1:\cdots:Y_m]) =
[X_0Y_0: X_0Y_1: \cdots :X_iY_j: \cdots :X_nY_m]\$$

(the monomials $X_i Y_j$ are taken in lexicographical order). The image of the map is a variety, called a Segre variety. It is sometimes written as $\Sigma_{n,m}$.

== Discussion ==
In the language of linear algebra, for given vector spaces U and V over the same field K, there is a natural way to linearly map their Cartesian product to their tensor product.

$$\varphi: U\times V \to U\otimes V.\$$

In general, this need not be injective because, for $u\in U$, $v\in V$ and any nonzero $c\in K$,

$$\varphi(u,v) = u\otimes v = cu\otimes c^{-1}v = \varphi(cu, c^{-1}v).\$$

Considering the underlying projective spaces $\mathbb{P}(U)$ and $\mathbb{P}(V)$, this mapping becomes a morphism of varieties

$$\sigma: \mathbb{P}(U)\times \mathbb{P}(V) \to \mathbb{P}(U\otimes V).\$$

This is not only injective in the set-theoretic sense: it is a closed immersion in the sense of algebraic geometry. That is, one can give a set of equations for the image. Except for notational trouble, it is easy to say what such equations are: they express two ways of factoring products of coordinates from the tensor product, obtained in two different ways as something from U times something from V.

This mapping or morphism σ is the Segre embedding. Counting dimensions, it shows how the product of projective spaces of dimensions m and n embeds in dimension

$$(m + 1)(n + 1) - 1 = mn + m + n.\$$

Classical terminology calls the coordinates on the product multihomogeneous, and the product generalised to k factors k-way projective space.

== Properties ==
The Segre variety is an example of a determinantal variety; it is the zero locus of the 2×2 minors of the matrix $(Z_{i,j})$. That is, the Segre variety is the common zero locus of the quadratic polynomials

$$Z_{i,j} Z_{k,l} - Z_{i,l} Z_{k,j}.\$$

Here, $Z_{i,j}$ is understood to be the natural coordinate on the image of the Segre map.

The Segre variety $\Sigma_{n,m}$ is the categorical product (in the category of projective varieties and homogeneous polynomial maps) of $\mathbb{P^n}$ and $\mathbb{P^m}$. The projection

$$\pi_X :\Sigma_{n,m} \to  \mathbb{P}^n\$$

to the first factor can be specified by m+1 maps on open subsets covering the Segre variety, which agree on intersections of the subsets. For fixed $j_0$, the map is given by sending $[Z_{i,j}]$ to $[Z_{i,j_0}]$. The equations $Z_{i,j} Z_{k,l} = Z_{i,l} Z_{k,j}\$ ensure that these maps agree with each other, because if $Z_{i_0,j_0}\neq 0$ we have $[Z_{i,j_1}]=[Z_{i_0,j_0}Z_{i,j_1}]=[Z_{i_0,j_1}Z_{i,j_0}]=[Z_{i,j_0}]$.

The fibers of the product are linear subspaces. That is, let

$$\pi_X :\Sigma_{n,m} \to  \mathbb{P}^n\$$

be the projection to the first factor; and likewise $\pi_Y$ for the second factor. Then the image of the map

$$\sigma (\pi_X (\cdot), \pi_Y (p)):\Sigma_{n,m}  \to   \mathbb{P}^{(n+1)(m+1)-1}\$$

for a fixed point p is a linear subspace of the codomain.

== Examples ==
=== Quadric ===
For example with m = n = 1 we get an embedding of the product of the projective line with itself in $\mathbb{P}^3$. The image is a quadric, and is easily seen to contain two one-parameter families of lines. Over the complex numbers this is a quite general non-singular quadric. Letting

$$[Z_0:Z_1:Z_2:Z_3]\$$

be the homogeneous coordinates on $\mathbb{P}^3$, this quadric is given as the zero locus of the quadratic polynomial given by the determinant

$$\det \left(\begin{matrix}Z_0&Z_1\\Z_2&Z_3\end{matrix}\right)
= Z_0Z_3 - Z_1Z_2.\$$

=== Segre threefold ===
The map

$$\sigma: \mathbb{P}^2 \times \mathbb{P}^1 \to \mathbb{P}^5$$

is known as the Segre threefold. It is an example of a rational normal scroll. The intersection of the Segre threefold and a three-plane $\mathbb{P}^3$ is a twisted cubic curve.

=== Veronese variety ===
The image of the diagonal $\Delta \subset \mathbb{P}^n \times \mathbb{P}^n$ under the Segre map is the Veronese variety of degree two

$$\nu_2:\mathbb{P}^n \to \mathbb{P}^{n^2+2n}.\$$

== Applications ==
Because the Segre map is to the categorical product of projective spaces, it is a natural mapping for describing non-entangled states in quantum mechanics and quantum information theory. More precisely, the Segre map describes how to take products of projective Hilbert spaces.

In algebraic statistics, Segre varieties correspond to independence models.

The Segre embedding of $\mathbb{P}^2 \times \mathbb{P}^2$ in $\mathbb{P}^8$ is the only Severi variety of dimension 4.
