= Scorza =

- Carlo Scorza, fascist
- Enzo Scorza, footballer
- Gaetano Scorza, mathematician
  - Scorza variety
- Manuel Scorza, novelist
- Sinibaldo Scorza, painter
