= Parabola =

Plane curve: conic section

Part of a parabola (blue), with various features (other colours). The complete parabola has no endpoints. In this orientation, it extends infinitely to the left, right, and upward.

The parabola is a member of the family of conic sections.

In mathematics, a parabola (/pəˈræbələ/ pə-RA-bə-lə) is a plane curve which is mirror-symmetrical and is approximately U-shaped. It fits several superficially different mathematical descriptions, which can all be proved to define exactly the same curves.

One description of a parabola involves a point (the focus) and a line (the directrix). The focus does not lie on the directrix. The parabola is the locus of points in that plane that are equidistant from the directrix and the focus. Another description of a parabola is as a conic section, created from the intersection of a right circular conical surface and a plane parallel to another plane that is tangential to the conical surface. (Note: The tangential plane just touches the conical surface along a line, which passes through the apex of the cone.)

The graph of a quadratic function $y=ax^2+bx+ c$ (with $a\neq 0$) is a parabola with its axis of symmetry parallel to the y-axis. Conversely, every such parabola is the graph of a quadratic function.

The line perpendicular to the directrix and passing through the focus (that is, the line that splits the parabola through the middle) is called the "axis of symmetry". The point where the parabola intersects its axis of symmetry is called the "vertex" and is the point where the parabola is most sharply curved. The distance between the vertex and the focus, measured along the axis of symmetry, is the "focal length". The "latus rectum" is the chord of the parabola that is parallel to the directrix and passes through the focus. Parabolas can open up, down, left, right, or in some other arbitrary direction. Any parabola can be repositioned and rescaled to fit exactly on any other parabola—that is, all parabolas are geometrically similar.

Parabolas have the property that, if they are made of material that reflects light, then light that travels parallel to the axis of symmetry of a parabola and strikes its concave side is reflected to its focus, regardless of where on the parabola the reflection occurs. Conversely, light that originates from a point source at the focus is reflected into a parallel ("collimated") beam, leaving the parabola parallel to the axis of symmetry. The same effects occur with sound and other waves. This reflective property is the basis of many practical uses of parabolas.

The parabola has many important applications, from a parabolic antenna or parabolic microphone to automobile headlight reflectors and the design of ballistic missiles. It is frequently used in physics, engineering, and many other areas.

== History ==
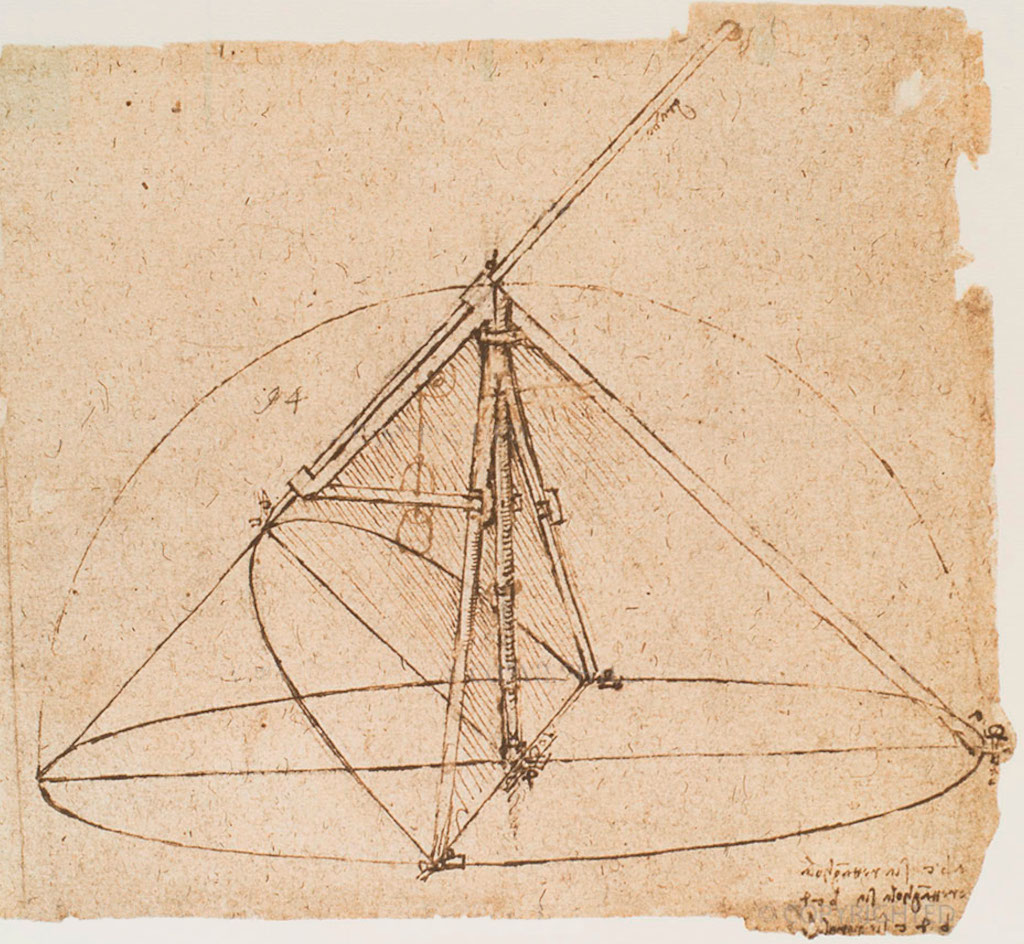
Parabolic compass designed by Leonardo da Vinci

The earliest known work on conic sections was by Menaechmus in the 4th century BC. He discovered a way to solve the problem of doubling the cube using parabolas. (The solution, however, does not meet the requirements of compass-and-straightedge construction.) The area enclosed by a parabola and a line segment, the so-called "parabola segment", was computed by Archimedes by the method of exhaustion in the 3rd century BC, in his The Quadrature of the Parabola. The name "parabola" is due to Apollonius, who discovered many properties of conic sections. It means "application", referring to "application of areas" concept, that has a connection with this curve, as Apollonius had proved. The focus–directrix property of the parabola and other conic sections was mentioned in the works of Pappus.

Galileo showed that the path of a projectile follows a parabola, a consequence of uniform acceleration due to gravity.

The idea that a parabolic reflector could produce an image was already well known before the invention of the reflecting telescope. Designs were proposed in the early to mid-17th century by many mathematicians, including René Descartes, Marin Mersenne, and James Gregory. When Isaac Newton built the first reflecting telescope in 1668, he skipped using a parabolic mirror because of the difficulty of fabrication, opting for a spherical mirror. Parabolic mirrors are used in most modern reflecting telescopes and in satellite dishes and radar receivers.

== Definition as a locus of points ==
A parabola can be defined geometrically as a set of points (locus) in the Euclidean plane, as follows.

A parabola is the set of the points whose distance to a fixed point, the focus, equals the distance to a fixed line, the directrix. That is, if $F$ is the focus and $l$ is the directrix, the parabola is the set of all points $P$ such that
$$d(P,F) = d(P,l),$$
where $d$ denotes Euclidean distance.

The point where this distance is minimal is the midpoint $V$ of the perpendicular from the focus $F$ to the directrix $l.$ It is called the vertex, and its distance to both the focus and the directrix is the focal length of the parabola.

The line $FV$ is the unique axis of symmetry of the parabola and called the axis of the parabola.

== In a Cartesian coordinate system ==
=== Axis of symmetry parallel to the y axis ===
Parabola with axis parallel to y-axis; p is the semi-latus rectum

In Cartesian coordinates, if the vertex $V$ is the origin and the directrix has the equation $y = -f$, then, by examining the case $x = 0$, the focus $F$ is on the positive $y$-axis, with $F = (0, f)$, where $f$ is the focal length.

The above geometric characterization implies that a point $P = (x, y)$ is on the parabola if and only if
$$x^2 + (y - f)^2 = (y + f)^2.$$
Solving for $y$ yields
$$y = \frac{1}{4f} x^2.$$

This parabola is U-shaped (opening to the top).

The horizontal chord through the focus is on the line of equation $y=f$ (see picture in opening section); it is called the latus rectum; one half of it is the semi-latus rectum. The latus rectum is parallel to the directrix. The semi-latus rectum is denoted by $p$. From the equation satisfied by the endpoints of the latus rectum, one gets
$$p = 2f.$$
Thus, the semi-lactus rectum is the distance from the focus to the directrix. Using the parameter $p$, the equation of the parabola can be rewritten as
$$x^2 = 2py.$$

More generally, if the vertex is $V = (v_1, v_2)$, the focus $F = (v_1, v_2 + f)$, and the directrix $y = v_2 - f$, one obtains the equation
$$y = \frac{1}{4f} (x - v_1)^2 + v_2 = \frac{1}{4f} x^2 - \frac{v_1}{2f} x + \frac{v_1^2}{4f} + v_2.$$

Remarks:

- If $f < 0$ in the above equations one gets parabola with a downward opening.
- The hypothesis that the axis is parallel to the $y$-axis implies that the parabola is the graph of a quadratic function. Conversely, the graph of an arbitrary quadratic function is a parabola (see next section).
- If one exchanges $x$ and $y$, one obtains equations of the form $y^2 = 2px$. These parabolas open to the left (if $p < 0$) or to the right (if $p > 0$).

=== General position ===
Parabola: general position

If the focus is $F = (f_1, f_2)$, and the directrix $ax + by + c = 0$, then one obtains the equation
$$\frac{(ax + by + c)^2}{a^2 + b^2} = (x - f_1)^2 + (y - f_2)^2$$

(the left side of the equation uses the Hesse normal form of a line to calculate the distance $|Pl|$).

For a parametric equation of a parabola in general position see § As the affine image of the unit parabola.

The implicit equation of a parabola is defined by an irreducible polynomial of degree two:
$$ax^2 + bxy + cy^2 + dx + ey + f = 0,$$
such that $b^2 - 4ac = 0,$ or, equivalently, such that $ax^2 + bxy + cy^2$ is the square of a linear polynomial.

== As a graph of a function ==
Parabolas $y = ax^2$

The previous section shows that any parabola with the origin as vertex and the y axis as axis of symmetry can be considered as the graph of a function
$$f(x) = a x^2 \text{ with } a \ne 0.$$

For $a > 0$ the parabolas are opening to the top, and for $a < 0$ are opening to the bottom (see picture). From the section above one obtains:

- The focus is $\left(0, \frac{1}{4a}\right)$,
- the focal length $\frac{1}{4a}$, the semi-latus rectum is $p = \frac{1}{2a}$,
- the vertex is $(0, 0)$,
- the directrix has the equation $y = -\frac{1}{4a}$,
- the tangent at point $(x_0, ax^2_0)$ has the equation $y = 2a x_0 x - a x^2_0$.

For $a = 1$ the parabola is the unit parabola with equation $y = x^2$. Its focus is $\left(0, \tfrac{1}{4}\right)$, the semi-latus rectum $p = \tfrac{1}{2}$, and the directrix has the equation $y = -\tfrac{1}{4}$.

The general function of degree 2 is
$$f(x) = ax^2 + bx + c ~~\text{ with }~~ a, b, c \in \R,\ a \ne 0.$$
Completing the square yields
$$f(x) = a \left(x + \frac{b}{2a}\right)^2 + \frac{4ac - b^2}{4a},$$
which is the equation of a parabola with

- the axis $x = -\frac{b}{2a}$ (parallel to the y axis),
- the focal length $\frac{1}{4a}$, the semi-latus rectum $p = \frac{1}{2a}$,
- the vertex $V = \left(-\frac{b}{2a}, \frac{4ac - b^2}{4a}\right)$,
- the focus $F = \left(-\frac{b}{2a}, \frac{4ac - b^2 + 1}{4a}\right)$,
- the directrix $y = \frac{4ac - b^2 - 1}{4a}$,
- the point of the parabola intersecting the y axis has coordinates $(0, c)$,
- the tangent at a point on the y axis has the equation $y = bx + c$.

== Similarity to the unit parabola ==
When the parabola $\color{blue}{y = 2x^2}$ is uniformly scaled by factor 2, the result is the parabola $\color{red}{y = x^2}$

Two objects in the Euclidean plane are similar if one can be transformed to the other by a similarity, that is, an arbitrary composition of rigid motions (translations and rotations) and uniform scalings.

A parabola $\mathcal P$ with vertex $V = (v_1, v_2)$ can be transformed by the translation $(x, y) \to (x - v_1, y - v_2)$ to one with the origin as vertex. A suitable rotation around the origin can then transform the parabola to one that has the y axis as axis of symmetry. Hence the parabola $\mathcal P$ can be transformed by a rigid motion to a parabola with an equation $y = ax^2,\ a \ne 0$. Such a parabola can then be transformed by the uniform scaling $(x, y) \to (ax, ay)$ into the unit parabola with equation $y = x^2$. Thus, any parabola can be mapped to the unit parabola by a similarity.

A synthetic approach, using similar triangles, can also be used to establish this result.

The general result is that two conic sections (necessarily of the same type) are similar if and only if they have the same eccentricity. Therefore, only circles (all having eccentricity 0) share this property with parabolas (all having eccentricity 1), while general ellipses and hyperbolas do not.

There are other simple affine transformations that map the parabola $y = ax^2$ onto the unit parabola, such as $(x, y) \to \left(x, \tfrac{y}{a}\right)$. But this mapping is not a similarity, and only shows that all parabolas are affinely equivalent (see § As the affine image of the unit parabola).

== As a special conic section ==
Pencil of conics with a common vertex

The pencil of conic sections with the x axis as axis of symmetry, one vertex at the origin (0, 0) and the same semi-latus rectum $p$ can be represented by the equation
$$y^2 = 2px +(e^2 - 1) x^2, \quad e \ge 0,$$
with $e$ the eccentricity.

- For $e = 0$ the conic is a circle (osculating circle of the pencil),
- for $0 < e < 1$ an ellipse,
- for $e = 1$ the parabola with equation $y^2 = 2px,$
- for $e > 1$ a hyperbola (see picture).

== In polar coordinates ==
Pencil of conics with a common focus

If p > 0, the parabola with equation $y^2 = 2px$ (opening to the right) has the polar representation
$$r = 2p \frac{\cos\varphi}{\sin^2\varphi}, \quad \varphi \in \left[ -\tfrac{\pi}{2} , \tfrac{\pi}{2} \right] \setminus \{0\}$$
where $r^2 = x^2 + y^2,\ x = r\cos\varphi$.

Its vertex is $V = (0, 0)$, and its focus is $F = \left(\tfrac{p}{2}, 0\right)$.

If one shifts the origin into the focus, that is, $F = (0, 0)$, one obtains the equation
$$r = \frac{p}{1 - \cos\varphi}, \quad \varphi \ne 2\pi k.$$

Remark 1: Inverting this polar form shows that a parabola is the inverse of a cardioid.

Remark 2: The second polar form is a special case of a pencil of conics with focus $F = (0, 0)$ (see picture):
$$r = \frac{p}{1 - e\cos\varphi}$$
($e$ is the eccentricity).

== Conic section and quadratic form ==
=== Diagram, description, and definitions ===
Cone with cross-sections

The diagram represents a cone with its axis A̅V̅. The point A is its apex. An inclined cross-section of the cone, shown in pink, is inclined from the axis by the same angle θ, as the side of the cone. According to the definition of a parabola as a conic section, the boundary of this pink cross-section EPD is a parabola.

A cross-section perpendicular to the axis of the cone passes through the vertex P of the parabola. This cross-section is circular, but appears elliptical when viewed obliquely, as is shown in the diagram. Its centre is V, and P̅K̅ is a diameter. We will call its radius r.

Another perpendicular to the axis, circular cross-section of the cone is farther from the apex A than the one just described. It has a chord D̅E̅, which joins the points where the parabola intersects the circle. Another chord B̅C̅ is the perpendicular bisector of D̅E̅ and is consequently a diameter of the circle. These two chords and the parabola's axis of symmetry P̅M̅ all intersect at the point M.

All the labelled points, except D and E, are coplanar. They are in the plane of symmetry of the whole figure. This includes the point F, which is not mentioned above. It is defined and discussed below, in § Position of the focus.

Let us call the length of D̅M̅ and of E̅M̅ x, and the length of P̅M̅ y.

=== Derivation of quadratic equation ===
The lengths of B̅M̅ and C̅M̅ are:

- $\overline\mathrm{BM} = 2y\cos\theta$ (triangle BPM is isosceles, because $\overline{PM} \parallel \overline{AC} \implies \angle PMB = \angle ACB = \angle ABC$
- $\overline\mathrm{CM} = 2r$ (PMCK is a parallelogram).

Using the intersecting chords theorem on the chords B̅C̅ and D̅E̅, we get
$$\overline\mathrm{BM} \cdot \overline\mathrm{CM} = \overline\mathrm{DM} \cdot \overline\mathrm{EM}.$$

Substituting:
$$4ry\cos\theta = x^2.$$

Rearranging:
$$y = \frac{x^2}{4r\cos\theta}.$$

For any given cone and parabola, r and θ are constants, but x and y are variables that depend on the arbitrary height at which the horizontal cross-section BECD is made. This last equation shows the relationship between these variables. They can be interpreted as Cartesian coordinates of the points D and E, in a system in the pink plane with P as its origin. Since x is squared in the equation, the fact that D and E are on opposite sides of the y axis is unimportant. If the horizontal cross-section moves up or down, toward or away from the apex of the cone, D and E move along the parabola, always maintaining the relationship between x and y shown in the equation. The parabolic curve is therefore the locus of points where the equation is satisfied, which makes it a Cartesian graph of the quadratic function in the equation.

=== Focal length ===
It is proved in a preceding section that if a parabola has its vertex at the origin, and if it opens in the positive y direction, then its equation is y = x^{2}/4f, where f is its focal length. (Note: As stated above in the lead, the focal length of a parabola is the distance between its vertex and focus.) Comparing this with the last equation above shows that the focal length of the parabola in the cone is r cos θ.

=== Position of the focus ===
In the diagram above, the point V is the foot of the perpendicular from the vertex of the parabola to the axis of the cone. The point F is the foot of the perpendicular from the point V to the plane of the parabola. (Note: The point V is the centre of the smaller circular cross-section of the cone. The point F is in the (pink) plane of the parabola, and the line V̅F̅ is perpendicular to the plane of the parabola.) By symmetry, F is on the axis of symmetry of the parabola. Angle VPF is complementary to θ, and angle PVF is complementary to angle VPF, therefore angle PVF is θ. Since the length of P̅V̅ is r, the distance of F from the vertex of the parabola is r sin θ. It is shown above that this distance equals the focal length of the parabola, which is the distance from the vertex to the focus. The focus and the point F are therefore equally distant from the vertex, along the same line, which implies that they are the same point. Therefore, the point F, defined above, is the focus of the parabola.

This discussion started from the definition of a parabola as a conic section, but it has now led to a description as a graph of a quadratic function. This shows that these two descriptions are equivalent. They both define curves of exactly the same shape.

=== Alternative proof with Dandelin spheres ===
Parabola (red): side projection view and top projection view of a cone with a Dandelin sphere

An alternative proof can be done using Dandelin spheres. It works without calculation and uses elementary geometric considerations only (see the derivation below).

The intersection of an upright cone by a plane $\pi$, whose inclination from vertical is the same as a generatrix (a.k.a. generator line, a line containing the apex and a point on the cone surface) $m_0$ of the cone, is a parabola (red curve in the diagram).

This generatrix $m_0$ is the only generatrix of the cone that is parallel to plane $\pi$. Otherwise, if there are two generatrices parallel to the intersecting plane, the intersection curve will be a hyperbola (or degenerate hyperbola, if the two generatrices are in the intersecting plane). If there is no generatrix parallel to the intersecting plane, the intersection curve will be an ellipse or a circle (or a point).

Let plane $\sigma$ be the plane that contains the vertical axis of the cone and line $m_0$. The inclination of plane $\pi$ from vertical is the same as line $m_0$ means that, viewing from the side (that is, the plane $\pi$ is perpendicular to plane $\sigma$), $m_0 \parallel \pi$.

In order to prove the directrix property of a parabola (see § Definition as a locus of points above), one uses a Dandelin sphere $d$, which is a sphere that touches the cone along a circle $c$ and plane $\pi$ at point $F$. The plane containing the circle $c$ intersects with plane $\pi$ at line $l$. There is a mirror symmetry in the system consisting of plane $\pi$, Dandelin sphere $d$ and the cone (the plane of symmetry is $\sigma$).

Since the plane containing the circle $c$ is perpendicular to plane $\sigma$, and $\pi \perp \sigma$, their intersection line $l$ must also be perpendicular to plane $\sigma$. Since line $m_0$ is in plane $\sigma$, $l \perp m_0$.

It turns out that $F$ is the focus of the parabola, and $l$ is the directrix of the parabola.

1. Let $P$ be an arbitrary point of the intersection curve.
2. The generatrix of the cone containing $P$ intersects circle $c$ at point $A$.
3. The line segments $\overline{PF}$ and $\overline{PA}$ are tangential to the sphere $d$, and hence are of equal length.
4. Generatrix $m_0$ intersects the circle $c$ at point $D$. The line segments $\overline{ZD}$ and $\overline{ZA}$ are tangential to the sphere $d$, and hence are of equal length.
5. Let line $q$ be the line parallel to $m_0$ and passing through point $P$. Since $m_0 \parallel \pi$, and point $P$ is in plane $\pi$, line $q$ must be in plane $\pi$. Since $m_0 \perp l$, we know that $q \perp l$ as well.
6. Let point $B$ be the foot of the perpendicular from point $P$ to line $l$, that is, $\overline{PB}$ is a segment of line $q$, and hence $\overline{PB} \parallel \overline{ZD}$.
7. From intercept theorem and $\overline{ZD} = \overline {ZA}$ we know that $\overline{PA} = \overline {PB}$. Since $\overline{PA} = \overline {PF}$, we know that $\overline{PF} = \overline {PB}$, which means that the distance from $P$ to the focus $F$ is equal to the distance from $P$ to the directrix $l$.

== Proof of the reflective property ==
Reflective property of a parabola

The reflective property states that if a parabola can reflect light, then light that enters it traveling parallel to the axis of symmetry is reflected toward the focus. This is derived from geometrical optics, based on the assumption that light travels in rays.

Consider the parabola y = x^{2}. Since all parabolas are similar, this simple case represents all others.

=== Construction and definitions ===
The point E is an arbitrary point on the parabola. The focus is F, the vertex is A (the origin), and the line F̅A̅ is the axis of symmetry. The line E̅C̅ is parallel to the axis of symmetry, intersects the x axis at D and intersects the directrix at C. The point B is the midpoint of the line segment F̅C̅.

=== Deductions ===
The vertex A is equidistant from the focus F and from the directrix. Since C is on the directrix, the y coordinates of F and C are equal in absolute value and opposite in sign. B is the midpoint of F̅C̅. Its x coordinate is half that of D, that is, x/2. The slope of the line B̅E̅ is the quotient of the lengths of E̅D̅ and B̅D̅, which is x^{2}/x/2 = 2x. But 2x is also the slope (first derivative) of the parabola at E. Therefore, the line B̅E̅ is the tangent to the parabola at E.

The distances E̅F̅ and E̅C̅ are equal because E is on the parabola, F is the focus and C is on the directrix. Therefore, since B is the midpoint of F̅C̅, triangles △FEB and △CEB are congruent (three sides), which implies that the angles marked α are congruent. (The angle above E is vertically opposite angle ∠BEC.) This means that a ray of light that enters the parabola and arrives at E travelling parallel to the axis of symmetry will be reflected by the line B̅E̅ so it travels along the line E̅F̅, as shown in red in the diagram (assuming that the lines can somehow reflect light). Since B̅E̅ is the tangent to the parabola at E, the same reflection will be done by an infinitesimal arc of the parabola at E. Therefore, light that enters the parabola and arrives at E travelling parallel to the axis of symmetry of the parabola is reflected by the parabola toward its focus.

This conclusion about reflected light applies to all points on the parabola, as is shown on the left side of the diagram. This is the reflective property.

=== Other consequences ===
There are other theorems that can be deduced simply from the above argument.

==== Tangent bisection property ====
The above proof and the accompanying diagram show that the tangent B̅E̅ bisects the angle ∠FEC. In other words, the tangent to the parabola at any point bisects the angle between the lines joining the point to the focus and perpendicularly to the directrix.

==== Intersection of a tangent and perpendicular from focus ====
Perpendicular from focus to tangent

Since triangles △FBE and △CBE are congruent, F̅B̅ is perpendicular to the tangent B̅E̅. Since B is on the x axis, which is the tangent to the parabola at its vertex, it follows that the point of intersection between any tangent to a parabola and the perpendicular from the focus to that tangent lies on the line that is tangential to the parabola at its vertex. See animated diagram and pedal curve.

==== Reflection of light striking the convex side ====
If light travels along the line C̅E̅, it moves parallel to the axis of symmetry and strikes the convex side of the parabola at E. It is clear from the above diagram that this light will be reflected directly away from the focus, along an extension of the segment F̅E̅.

=== Alternative proofs ===
Parabola and tangent

The above proofs of the reflective and tangent bisection properties use a line of calculus. Here a geometric proof is presented.

In this diagram, F is the focus of the parabola, and T and U lie on its directrix. P is an arbitrary point on the parabola. P̅T̅ is perpendicular to the directrix, and the line M̅P̅ bisects angle ∠FPT. Q is another point on the parabola, with Q̅U̅ perpendicular to the directrix. We know that F̅P̅ = P̅T̅ and F̅Q̅ = Q̅U̅. Clearly, Q̅T̅ > Q̅U̅, so Q̅T̅ > F̅Q̅. All points on the bisector M̅P̅ are equidistant from F and T, but Q is closer to F than to T. This means that Q is to the left of M̅P̅, that is, on the same side of it as the focus. The same would be true if Q were located anywhere else on the parabola (except at the point P), so the entire parabola, except the point P, is on the focus side of M̅P̅. Therefore, M̅P̅ is the tangent to the parabola at P. Since it bisects the angle ∠FPT, this proves the tangent bisection property.

The logic of the last paragraph can be applied to modify the above proof of the reflective property. It effectively proves the line B̅E̅ to be the tangent to the parabola at E if the angles α are equal. The reflective property follows as shown previously.

== Pin and string construction ==
Parabola: pin string construction

The definition of a parabola by its focus and directrix can be used for drawing it with help of pins and strings:

1. Choose the focus $F$ and the directrix $l$ of the parabola.
2. Take a triangle of a set square and prepare a string with length $|AB|$ (see diagram).
3. Pin one end of the string at point $A$ of the triangle and the other one to the focus $F$.
4. Position the triangle such that the second edge of the right angle is free to slide along the directrix.
5. Take a pen and hold the string tight to the triangle.
6. While moving the triangle along the directrix, the pen draws an arc of a parabola, because of $|PF| = |PB|$ (see definition of a parabola).

== Properties related to Pascal's theorem ==
A parabola can be considered as the affine part of a non-degenerated projective conic with a point $Y_\infty$ on the line of infinity $g_\infty$, which is the tangent at $Y_\infty$. The 5-, 4- and 3- point degenerations of Pascal's theorem are properties of a conic dealing with at least one tangent. If one considers this tangent as the line at infinity and its point of contact as the point at infinity of the y axis, one obtains three statements for a parabola.

The following properties of a parabola deal only with terms connect, intersect, parallel, which are invariants of similarities. So, it is sufficient to prove any property for the unit parabola with equation $y = x^2$.

=== 4-points property ===
4-points property of a parabola

Any parabola can be described in a suitable coordinate system by an equation $y = ax^2$.

Let $P_1 = (x_1, y_1),\ P_2 = (x_2, y_2),\ P_3 = (x_3, y_3),\ P_4 = (x_4, y_4)$ be four points of the parabola $y = ax^2$, and $Q_2$ the intersection of the secant line $P_1 P_4$ with the line $x = x_2,$ and let $Q_1$ be the intersection of the secant line $P_2 P_3$ with the line $x = x_1$ (see picture). Then the secant line $P_3 P_4$ is parallel to line $Q_1 Q_2$. (The lines $x = x_1$ and $x = x_2$ are parallel to the axis of the parabola.)

Proof: straightforward calculation for the unit parabola $y = x^2$.

Application: The 4-points property of a parabola can be used for the construction of point $P_4$, while $P_1, P_2, P_3$ and $Q_2$ are given.

Remark: the 4-points property of a parabola is an affine version of the 5-point degeneration of Pascal's theorem.

=== 3-points–1-tangent property ===
3-points–1-tangent property

Let $P_0=(x_0,y_0),P_1=(x_1,y_1),P_2=(x_2,y_2)$ be three points of the parabola with equation $y = ax^2$ and $Q_2$ the intersection of the secant line $P_0P_1$ with the line $x = x_2$ and $Q_1$ the intersection of the secant line $P_0P_2$ with the line $x = x_1$ (see picture). Then the tangent at point $P_0$ is parallel to the line $Q_1 Q_2$. (The lines $x=x_1$ and $x = x_2$ are parallel to the axis of the parabola.)

Proof: can be performed for the unit parabola $y=x^2$. A short calculation shows: line $Q_1Q_2$ has slope $2x_0$ which is the slope of the tangent at point $P_0$.

Application: The 3-points-1-tangent-property of a parabola can be used for the construction of the tangent at point $P_0$, while $P_1,P_2,P_0$ are given.

Remark: The 3-points-1-tangent-property of a parabola is an affine version of the 4-point-degeneration of Pascal's theorem.

=== 2-points–2-tangents property ===
2-points–2-tangents property

Let $P_1 = (x_1, y_1),\ P_2 = (x_2, y_2)$ be two points of the parabola with equation $y = ax^2$, and $Q_2$ the intersection of the tangent at point $P_1$ with the line $x = x_2$, and $Q_1$ the intersection of the tangent at point $P_2$ with the line $x = x_1$ (see picture). Then the secant $P_1 P_2$ is parallel to the line $Q_1 Q_2$. (The lines $x = x_1$ and $x = x_2$ are parallel to the axis of the parabola.)

Proof: straight forward calculation for the unit parabola $y = x^2$.

Application: The 2-points–2-tangents property can be used for the construction of the tangent of a parabola at point $P_2$, if $P_1, P_2$ and the tangent at $P_1$ are given.

Remark 1: The 2-points–2-tangents property of a parabola is an affine version of the 3-point degeneration of Pascal's theorem.

Remark 2: The 2-points–2-tangents property should not be confused with the following property of a parabola, which also deals with 2 points and 2 tangents, but is not related to Pascal's theorem.

=== Axis direction ===
Construction of the axis direction

The statements above presume the knowledge of the axis direction of the parabola, in order to construct the points $Q_1, Q_2$. The following property determines the points $Q_1, Q_2$ by two given points and their tangents only, and the result is that the line $Q_1 Q_2$ is parallel to the axis of the parabola.

Let

1. $P_1 = (x_1, y_1),\ P_2 = (x_2, y_2)$ be two points of the parabola $y = ax^2$, and $t_1, t_2$ be their tangents;
2. $Q_1$ be the intersection of the tangents $t_1, t_2$,
3. $Q_2$ be the intersection of the parallel line to $t_1$ through $P_2$ with the parallel line to $t_2$ through $P_1$ (see picture).

Then the line $Q_1 Q_2$ is parallel to the axis of the parabola and has the equation $x = (x_1 + x_2) / 2.$

Proof: can be done (like the properties above) for the unit parabola $y = x^2$.

Application: This property can be used to determine the direction of the axis of a parabola, if two points and their tangents are given. An alternative way is to determine the midpoints of two parallel chords, see section on parallel chords.

Remark: This property is an affine version of the theorem of two perspective triangles of a non-degenerate conic.

Related: Chord $P_1 P_2$ has two additional properties:

1. Its slope is the harmonic average of the slopes of tangents $t_1$ and $t_2$.
2. It is parallel to the tangent at the intersection of $Q_1 Q_2$ with the parabola.

== Steiner generation ==
=== Parabola ===
Steiner generation of a parabola

Steiner established the following procedure for the construction of a non-degenerate conic (see Steiner conic):

Given two pencils $B(U), B(V)$ of lines at two points $U, V$ (all lines containing $U$ and $V$ respectively) and a projective but not perspective mapping $\pi$ of $B(U)$ onto $B(V)$, the intersection points of corresponding lines form a non-degenerate projective conic section.

This procedure can be used for a simple construction of points on the parabola $y = ax^2$:

- Consider the pencil at the vertex $S(0, 0)$ and the set of lines $\Pi_y$ that are parallel to the y axis.
  1. Let $P = (x_0, y_0)$ be a point on the parabola, and $A = (0, y_0)$, $B = (x_0, 0)$.
  2. The line segment $\overline{BP}$ is divided into n equally spaced segments, and this division is projected (in the direction $BA$) onto the line segment $\overline{AP}$ (see figure). This projection gives rise to a projective mapping $\pi$ from pencil $S$ onto the pencil $\Pi_y$.
  3. The intersection of the line $SB_i$ and the i-th parallel to the y axis is a point on the parabola.

Proof: straightforward calculation.

Remark: Steiner's generation is also available for ellipses and hyperbolas.

=== Dual parabola ===
Dual parabola and Bézier curve of degree 2 (right: curve point and division points $Q_0, Q_1$ for parameter $t = 0.4$)

A dual parabola consists of the set of tangents of an ordinary parabola.

The Steiner generation of a conic can be applied to the generation of a dual conic by changing the meanings of points and lines:

Let be given two point sets on two lines $u, v$, and a projective but not perspective mapping $\pi$ between these point sets, then the connecting lines of corresponding points form a non degenerate dual conic.

In order to generate elements of a dual parabola, one starts with

1. three points $P_0, P_1, P_2$ not on a line,
2. divides the line sections $\overline{P_0 P_1}$ and $\overline{P_1 P_2}$ each into $n$ equally spaced line segments and adds numbers as shown in the picture.
3. Then the lines $P_0 P_1, P_1 P_2, (1,1), (2,2), \dotsc$ are tangents of a parabola, hence elements of a dual parabola.
4. The parabola is a Bézier curve of degree 2 with the control points $P_0, P_1, P_2$.

The proof is a consequence of the de Casteljau algorithm for a Bézier curve of degree 2.

== Inscribed angles and the 3-point form ==
Inscribed angles of a parabola

A parabola with equation $y = ax^2 + bx + c,\ a \ne 0$ is uniquely determined by three points $(x_1, y_1), (x_2, y_2), (x_3, y_3)$ with different x coordinates. The usual procedure to determine the coefficients $a, b, c$ is to insert the point coordinates into the equation. The result is a linear system of three equations, which can be solved by Gaussian elimination or Cramer's rule, for example. An alternative way uses the inscribed angle theorem for parabolas.

In the following, the angle of two lines will be measured by the difference of the slopes of the line with respect to the directrix of the parabola. That is, for a parabola of equation $y = ax^2 + bx + c,$ the angle between two lines of equations $y = m_1 x + d_1,\ y = m_2x + d_2$ is measured by $m_1 - m_2.$

Analogous to the inscribed angle theorem for circles, one has the inscribed angle theorem for parabolas:

Four points $P_i = (x_i, y_i),\ i = 1, \ldots, 4,$ with different x coordinates (see picture) are on a parabola with equation $y = ax^2 + bx + c$ if and only if the angles at $P_3$ and $P_4$ have the same measure, as defined above. That is,
$$\frac{y_4 - y_1}{x_4 - x_1} - \frac{y_4 - y_2}{x_4 - x_2} = \frac{y_3 - y_1}{x_3 - x_1} - \frac{y_3 - y_2}{x_3 - x_2}.$$

(Proof: straightforward calculation: If the points are on a parabola, one may translate the coordinates for having the equation $y = ax^2$, then one has $\frac{y_i - y_j}{x_i - x_j} = x_i + x_j$ if the points are on the parabola.)

A consequence is that the equation (in ${\color{green}x}, {\color{red}y}$) of the parabola determined by 3 points $P_i = (x_i, y_i),\ i = 1, 2, 3,$ with different x coordinates is (if two x coordinates are equal, there is no parabola with directrix parallel to the x axis, which passes through the points)
$$\frac{{\color{red}y} - y_1}{{\color{green}x} - x_1} - \frac{{\color{red}y} - y_2}{{\color{green}x} - x_2} = \frac{y_3 - y_1}{x_3 - x_1} - \frac{y_3 - y_2}{x_3 - x_2}.$$
Multiplying by the denominators that depend on ${\color{green}x},$ one obtains the more standard form
$$(x_1 - x_2){\color{red}y} = ({\color{green}x} - x_1)({\color{green}x} - x_2) \left(\frac{y_3 - y_1}{x_3 - x_1} - \frac{y_3 - y_2}{x_3 - x_2}\right) + (y_1 - y_2){\color{green}x} + x_1 y_2 - x_2 y_1.$$

== Pole–polar relation ==
Parabola: pole–polar relation

In a suitable coordinate system any parabola can be described by an equation $y = ax^2$. The equation of the tangent at a point $P_0 = (x_0, y_0),\ y_0 = ax^2_0$ is
$$y = 2ax_0(x - x_0) + y_0 = 2ax_0x - ax^2_0 = 2ax_0x - y_0.$$
One obtains the function
$$(x_0, y_0) \to y = 2ax_0x - y_0$$
on the set of points of the parabola onto the set of tangents.

Obviously, this function can be extended onto the set of all points of $\R^2$ to a bijection between the points of $\R^2$ and the lines with equations $y = mx + d, \ m, d \in \R$. The inverse mapping is
$$\text{line } y = mx + d ~~ \rightarrow ~~ \text{point } (\tfrac{m}{2a}, -d).$$
This relation is called the pole–polar relation of the parabola, where the point is the pole, and the corresponding line its polar.

By calculation, one checks the following properties of the pole–polar relation of the parabola:

- For a point (pole) on the parabola, the polar is the tangent at this point (see picture: $P_1,\ p_1$).
- For a pole $P$ outside the parabola the intersection points of its polar with the parabola are the touching points of the two tangents passing $P$ (see picture: $P_2,\ p_2$).
- For a point within the parabola the polar has no point with the parabola in common (see picture: $P_3,\ p_3$ and $P_4,\ p_4$).
- The intersection point of two polar lines (see picture: $p_3, p_4$) is the pole of the connecting line of their poles (see picture: $P_3, P_4$).
- Focus and directrix of the parabola are a pole–polar pair.

Remark: Pole–polar relations also exist for ellipses and hyperbolas.

== Tangent properties ==
=== Two tangent properties related to the latus rectum ===
Let the axis of symmetry intersect the parabola at point Q, and denote the focus as point F and its distance from point Q as f. Let the perpendicular to the axis of symmetry, through the focus, intersect the parabola at points T and T'. Then (1) the distance from F to T (T') is 2f, and (2) a tangent to the parabola at point T (T') intersects the line of symmetry at a 45° (-45°) angle.

Perpendicular tangents intersect on the directrix

=== Orthoptic property ===
If two tangents to a parabola are perpendicular to each other, then they intersect on the directrix. Conversely, two tangents that intersect on the directrix are perpendicular. In other words, at any point on the directrix the whole parabola subtends a right angle.

=== Lambert's theorem ===
Let three tangents to a parabola form a triangle. Then Lambert's theorem states that the focus of the parabola lies on the circumcircle of the triangle.

Tsukerman's converse to Lambert's theorem states that, given three lines that bound a triangle, if two of the lines are tangent to a parabola whose focus lies on the circumcircle of the triangle, then the third line is also tangent to the parabola.

== Facts related to chords and arcs ==
=== Focal length calculated from parameters of a chord ===
Suppose a chord crosses a parabola perpendicular to its axis of symmetry. Let the length of the chord between the points where it intersects the parabola be c and the distance from the vertex of the parabola to the chord, measured along the axis of symmetry, be d. The focal length, f, of the parabola is given by
$$f = \frac{c^2}{16d}.$$

Proof

Suppose a system of Cartesian coordinates is used such that the vertex of the parabola is at the origin, and the axis of symmetry is the y axis. The parabola opens upward. It is shown elsewhere in this article that the equation of the parabola is 4fy = x^{2}, where f is the focal length. At the positive x end of the chord, x = c/2 and y = d. Since this point is on the parabola, these coordinates must satisfy the equation above. Therefore, by substitution, $4fd = \left(\tfrac{c}{2}\right)^2$. From this, $f = \tfrac{c^2}{16d}$.

=== Area enclosed between a parabola and a chord ===
Parabola (magenta) and line (lower light blue) including a chord (blue). The area enclosed between them is in pink. The chord itself ends at the points where the line intersects the parabola.

The area enclosed between a parabola and a chord (see diagram) is two-thirds of the area of a parallelogram that surrounds it. One side of the parallelogram is the chord, and the opposite side is a tangent to the parabola. The slope of the other parallel sides is irrelevant to the area. Often, as here, they are drawn parallel with the parabola's axis of symmetry, but this is arbitrary.

A theorem equivalent to this one, but different in details, was derived by Archimedes in the 3rd century BCE. He used the areas of triangles, rather than that of the parallelogram. (Note: Archimedes proved that the area of the enclosed parabolic segment was 4/3 as large as that of a triangle that he inscribed within the enclosed segment. It can easily be shown that the parallelogram has twice the area of the triangle, so Archimedes' proof also proves the theorem with the parallelogram.) See The Quadrature of the Parabola.

If the chord has length b and is perpendicular to the parabola's axis of symmetry, and if the perpendicular distance from the parabola's vertex to the chord is h, the parallelogram is a rectangle, with sides of b and h. The area A of the parabolic segment enclosed by the parabola and the chord is therefore
$$A = \frac{2}{3} bh.$$

This formula can be compared with the area of a triangle: 1/2bh.

In general, the enclosed area can be calculated as follows. First, locate the point on the parabola where its slope equals that of the chord. This can be done with calculus, or by using a line that is parallel to the axis of symmetry of the parabola and passes through the midpoint of the chord. The required point is where this line intersects the parabola. (Note: This method can be easily proved correct by calculus. It was also known and used by Archimedes, although he lived nearly 2000 years before calculus was invented.) Then, using the formula given in Distance from a point to a line, calculate the perpendicular distance from this point to the chord. Multiply this by the length of the chord to get the area of the parallelogram, then by 2/3 to get the required enclosed area.

=== Corollary concerning midpoints and endpoints of chords ===
Midpoints of parallel chords

A corollary of the above discussion is that if a parabola has several parallel chords, their midpoints all lie on a line parallel to the axis of symmetry. If tangents to the parabola are drawn through the endpoints of any of these chords, the two tangents intersect on this same line parallel to the axis of symmetry (see Axis-direction of a parabola). (Note: A proof of this sentence can be inferred from the proof of the orthoptic property, above. It is shown there that the tangents to the parabola y = x^{2} at (p, p^{2}) and (q, q^{2}) intersect at a point whose x coordinate is the mean of p and q. Thus if there is a chord between these two points, the intersection point of the tangents has the same x coordinate as the midpoint of the chord.)

=== Arc length ===
If a point X is located on a parabola with focal length f, and if p is the perpendicular distance from X to the axis of symmetry of the parabola, then the lengths of arcs of the parabola that terminate at X can be calculated from f and p as follows, assuming they are all expressed in the same units. (Note: In this calculation, the square root q must be positive. The quantity ln a is the natural logarithm of a.)
$$\begin{align}
h &= \frac{p}{2}, \\
q &= \sqrt{f^2 + h^2}, \\
s &= \frac{hq}{f} + f \ln\frac{h + q}{f}.
\end{align}$$

This quantity s is the length of the arc between X and the vertex of the parabola.

The length of the arc between X and the symmetrically opposite point on the other side of the parabola is 2s.

The perpendicular distance p can be given a positive or negative sign to indicate on which side of the axis of symmetry X is situated. Reversing the sign of p reverses the signs of h and s without changing their absolute values. If these quantities are signed, the length of the arc between any two points on the parabola is always shown by the difference between their values of s. The calculation can be simplified by using the properties of logarithms:
$$s_1 - s_2 = \frac{h_1 q_1 - h_2 q_2}{f} + f \ln\frac{h_1 + q_1}{h_2 + q_2}.$$

This can be useful, for example, in calculating the size of the material needed to make a parabolic reflector or parabolic trough.

This calculation can be used for a parabola in any orientation. It is not restricted to the situation where the axis of symmetry is parallel to the y axis.

== A geometrical construction to find a sector area ==
Construction for finding the area of a sector

$S$ is the focus, and $V$ is the principal vertex of the parabola $VG$. Draw $VX$ perpendicular to $SV$.

Take any point $B$ on $VG$ and drop a perpendicular $BQ$ from $B$ to $VX$. Draw perpendicular $ST$ intersecting $BQ$, extended if necessary, at $T$. At $B$ draw the perpendicular $BJ$, intersecting $VX$ at $J$.

For the parabola, the segment $VBV$, the area enclosed by the chord $VB$ and the arc $VB$, is equal to $\Delta VBQ / 3$, also $BQ = \frac{VQ^2}{4SV}$.

The area of the parabolic sector $SVB = \triangle SVB + \frac{\triangle VBQ}{3} = \frac{SV \cdot VQ}{2} + \frac{VQ \cdot BQ}{6}$.

Since triangles $TSB$ and $QBJ$ are similar,
$$VJ = VQ - JQ = VQ - \frac{BQ \cdot TB}{ST} = VQ - \frac{BQ \cdot (SV - BQ)}{VQ} = \frac{3VQ}{4} + \frac{VQ \cdot BQ}{4SV}.$$

Therefore, the area of the parabolic sector $SVB = \frac{2SV \cdot VJ}{3}$ and can be found from the length of $VJ$, as found above.

A circle through $S$, $V$ and $B$ also passes through $J$.

Conversely, if a point, $B$ on the parabola $VG$ is to be found so that the area of the sector $SVB$ is equal to a specified value, determine the point $J$ on $VX$ and construct a circle through $S$, $V$ and $J$. Since $SJ$ is the diameter, the center of the circle is at its midpoint, and it lies on the perpendicular bisector of $SV$, a distance of one half $VJ$ from SV$.$ The required point $B$ is where this circle intersects the parabola.

If a body traces the path of the parabola due to an inverse square force directed towards $S$, the area $SVB$ increases at a constant rate as point $B$ moves forward. It follows that $J$ moves at constant speed along $VX$ as $B$ moves along the parabola.

If the speed of the body at the vertex where it is moving perpendicularly to $SV$ is $v$, then the speed of J is equal to $3v/4$.

The construction can be extended simply to include the case where neither radius coincides with the axis $SV$ as follows. Let $A$ be a fixed point on $VG$ between $V$ and $B$, and point $H$ be the intersection on $VX$ with the perpendicular to $SA$ at $A$. From the above, the area of the parabolic sector $SAB = \frac{2SV \cdot (VJ - VH)}{3} = \frac{2SV \cdot HJ}{3}$.

Conversely, if it is required to find the point $B$ for a particular area $SAB$, find point $J$ from $HJ$ and point $B$ as before. By Book 1, Proposition 16, Corollary 6 of Newton's Principia, the speed of a body moving along a parabola with a force directed towards the focus is inversely proportional to the square root of the radius. If the speed at $A$ is $v$, then at the vertex $V$ it is $\sqrt{\frac{SA}{SV}} v$, and point $J$ moves at a constant speed of $\frac{3v}{4} \sqrt{\frac{SA}{SV}}$.

The above construction was devised by Isaac Newton and can be found in Book 1 of Philosophiæ Naturalis Principia Mathematica as Proposition 30.

== Focal length and radius of curvature at the vertex ==
The focal length of a parabola is half of its radius of curvature at its vertex.

Proof

Image is inverted. AB is x axis. C is origin. O is center. A is (x, y). OA = OC = R. PA = x. CP = y. OP = (R − y). Other points and lines are irrelevant for this purpose.

The radius of curvature at the vertex is twice the focal length. The measurements shown on the above diagram are in units of the latus rectum, which is four times the focal length.

Consider a point (x, y) on a circle of radius R and with center at the point (0, R). The circle passes through the origin. If the point is near the origin, the Pythagorean theorem shows that
$$\begin{align}
x^2 + (R - y)^2 &= R^2, \\[1ex]
x^2 + R^2 - 2Ry + y^2 &= R^2, \\[1ex]
x^2 + y^2 &= 2Ry.
\end{align}$$

But if (x, y) is extremely close to the origin, since the x axis is a tangent to the circle, y is very small compared with x, so y^{2} is negligible compared with the other terms. Therefore, extremely close to the origin

$$x^2 = 2Ry.$$	1

Compare this with the parabola

$$x^2 = 4fy,$$	2

which has its vertex at the origin, opens upward, and has focal length f (see preceding sections of this article).

Equations (1) and (2) are equivalent if R = 2f. Therefore, this is the condition for the circle and parabola to coincide at and extremely close to the origin. The radius of curvature at the origin, which is the vertex of the parabola, is twice the focal length.

Corollary

A concave mirror that is a small segment of a sphere behaves approximately like a parabolic mirror, focusing parallel light to a point midway between the centre and the surface of the sphere.

== As the affine image of the unit parabola ==
Parabola as an affine image of the unit parabola

Another definition of a parabola uses affine transformations:

Any parabola is the affine image of the unit parabola with equation $y = x^2$.

=== Parametric representation ===
An affine transformation of the Euclidean plane has the form $\vec x \to \vec f_0 + A \vec x$, where $A$ is a regular matrix (determinant is not 0), and $\vec f_0$ is an arbitrary vector. If $\vec f_1, \vec f_2$ are the column vectors of the matrix $A$, the unit parabola $(t, t^2),\ t \in \R$ is mapped onto the parabola
$$\vec x = \vec p(t) = \vec f_0 +\vec f_1 t +\vec f_2 t^2,$$
where

- $\vec f_0$ is a point of the parabola,
- $\vec f_1$ is a tangent vector at point $\vec f_0$,
- $\vec f_2$ is parallel to the axis of the parabola (axis of symmetry through the vertex).

=== Vertex ===
In general, the two vectors $\vec f_1, \vec f_2$ are not perpendicular, and $\vec f_0$ is not the vertex, unless the affine transformation is a similarity.

The tangent vector at the point $\vec p(t)$ is $\vec p'(t) = \vec f_1 + 2t \vec f_2$. At the vertex the tangent vector is orthogonal to $\vec f_2$. Hence the parameter $t_0$ of the vertex is the solution of the equation
$$\vec p'(t) \cdot \vec f_2 = \vec f_1 \cdot \vec f_2 + 2t f_2^2 = 0,$$
which is
$$t_0 = -\frac{\vec f_1 \cdot \vec f_2}{2 f_2^2},$$
and the vertex is
$$\vec p(t_0) = \vec f_0 - \frac{\vec f_1 \cdot \vec f_2}{2 f_2^2} \vec f_1 + \frac{(\vec f_1 \cdot \vec f_2)^2}{4(f_2^2)^2} \vec f_2.$$

=== Focal length and focus ===
The focal length can be determined by a suitable parameter transformation (which does not change the geometric shape of the parabola). The focal length is
$$f = \frac{f_1^2 \, f_2^2 - (\vec f_1 \cdot \vec f_2)^2}{4|f_2|^3}.$$
Hence the focus of the parabola is
$$F:\ \vec f_0 - \frac{\vec f_1 \cdot \vec f_2}{2 f_2^2} \vec f_1 + \frac{f_1^2 \, f_2^2}{4(f_2^2)^2} \vec f_2.$$

=== Implicit representation ===
Solving the parametric representation for $\; t, t^2\;$ by Cramer's rule and using $\;t\cdot t-t^2 =0\;$, one gets the implicit representation
$$\det(\vec x\!-\!\vec f\!_0,\vec f\!_2)^2-\det(\vec f\!_1,\vec x\!-\!\vec f\!_0)\det(\vec f\!_1,\vec f\!_2) = 0.$$

=== Parabola in space ===
The definition of a parabola in this section gives a parametric representation of an arbitrary parabola, even in space, if one allows $\vec f\!_0, \vec f\!_1, \vec f\!_2$ to be vectors in space.

== As quadratic Bézier curve ==
Quadratic Bézier curve and its control points

A quadratic Bézier curve is a curve $\vec c(t)$ defined by three points $P_0: \vec p_0$, $P_1: \vec p_1$ and $P_2: \vec p_2$, called its control points:
$$\begin{align}
\vec c(t) &= \sum_{i=0}^2 \binom{2}{i} t^i (1 - t)^{2-i} \vec p_i \\[1ex]
&= (1 - t)^2 \vec p_0 + 2t(1 - t) \vec p_1 + t^2 \vec p_2 \\[2ex]
&= \left(\vec p_0 - 2\vec p_1 + \vec p_2\right) t^2 + \left(-2\vec p_0 + 2\vec p_1\right) t + \vec p_0, \quad t \in [0, 1].
\end{align}$$

This curve is an arc of a parabola (see § As the affine image of the unit parabola).

== Numerical integration ==
Simpson's rule: the graph of a function is replaced by an arc of a parabola

In one method of numerical integration one replaces the graph of a function by arcs of parabolas and integrates the parabola arcs. A parabola is determined by three points. The formula for one arc is
$$\int_a^b f(x)\,dx \approx \frac{b - a}{6} \cdot \left( f(a) + 4f\left( \frac{a + b}{2} \right) + f(b) \right).$$

The method is called Simpson's rule.

== As plane section of quadric ==
The following quadrics contain parabolas as plane sections:

- elliptical cone,
- parabolic cylinder,
- elliptical paraboloid,
- hyperbolic paraboloid,
- hyperboloid of one sheet,
- hyperboloid of two sheets.
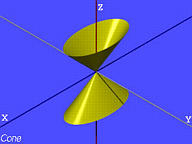
Elliptic cone

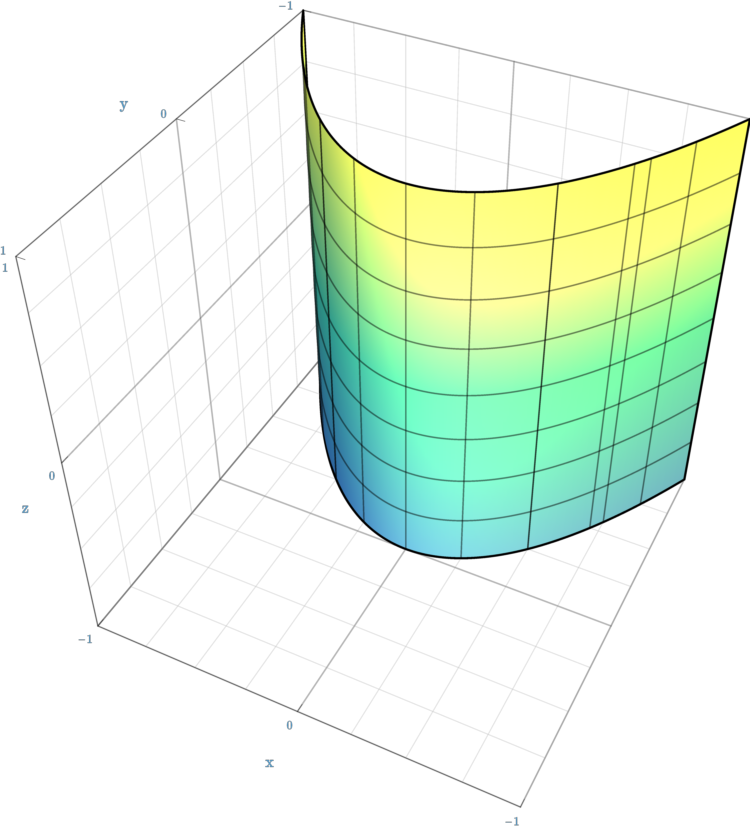
Parabolic cylinder

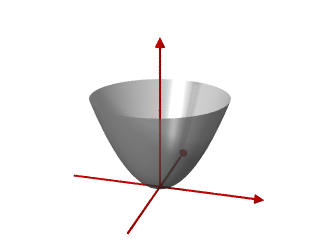
Elliptic paraboloid

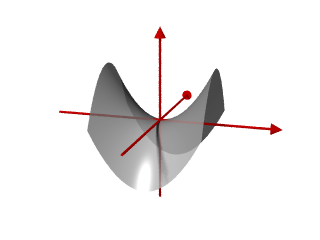
Hyperbolic paraboloid

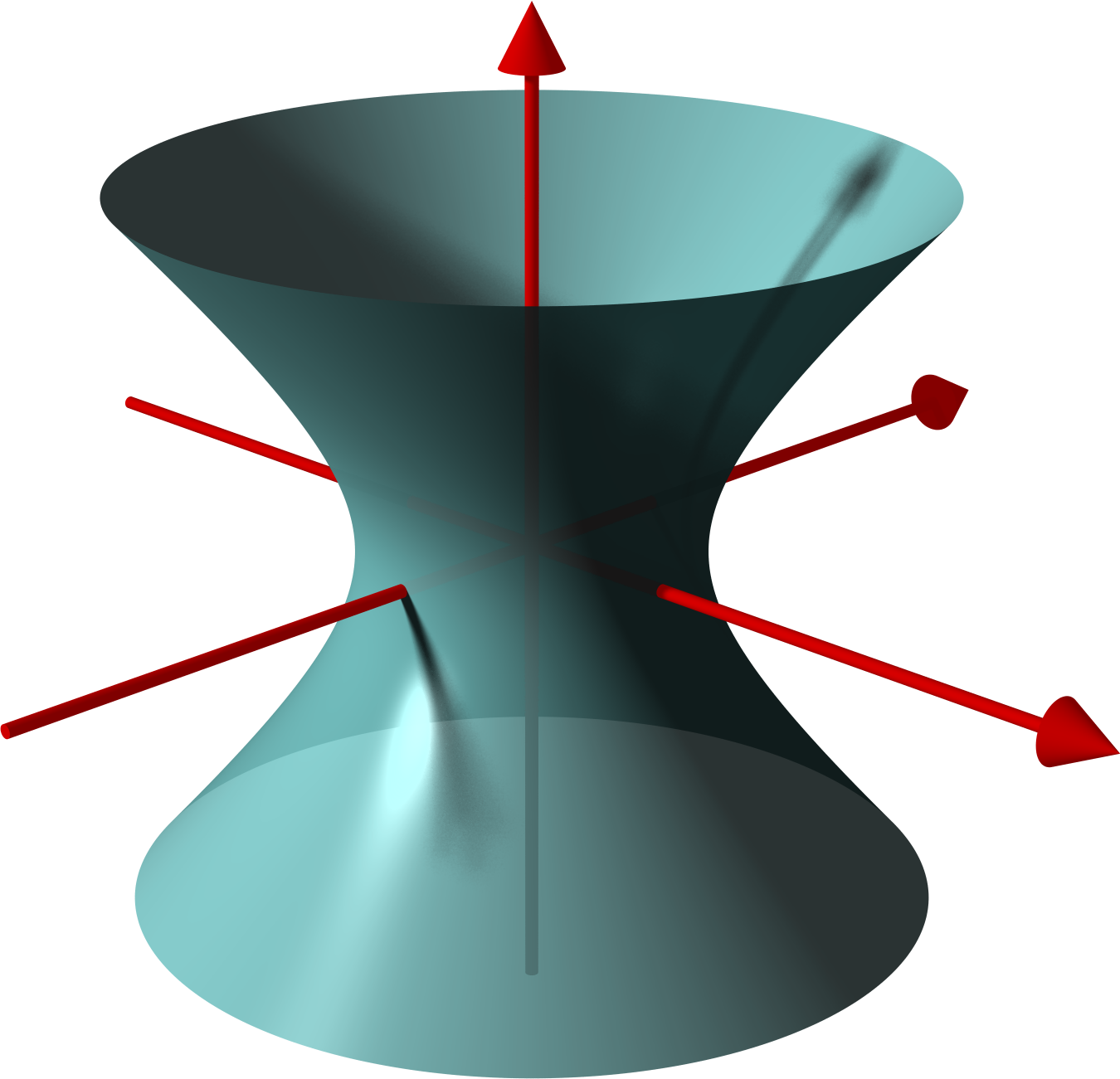
Hyperboloid of one sheet

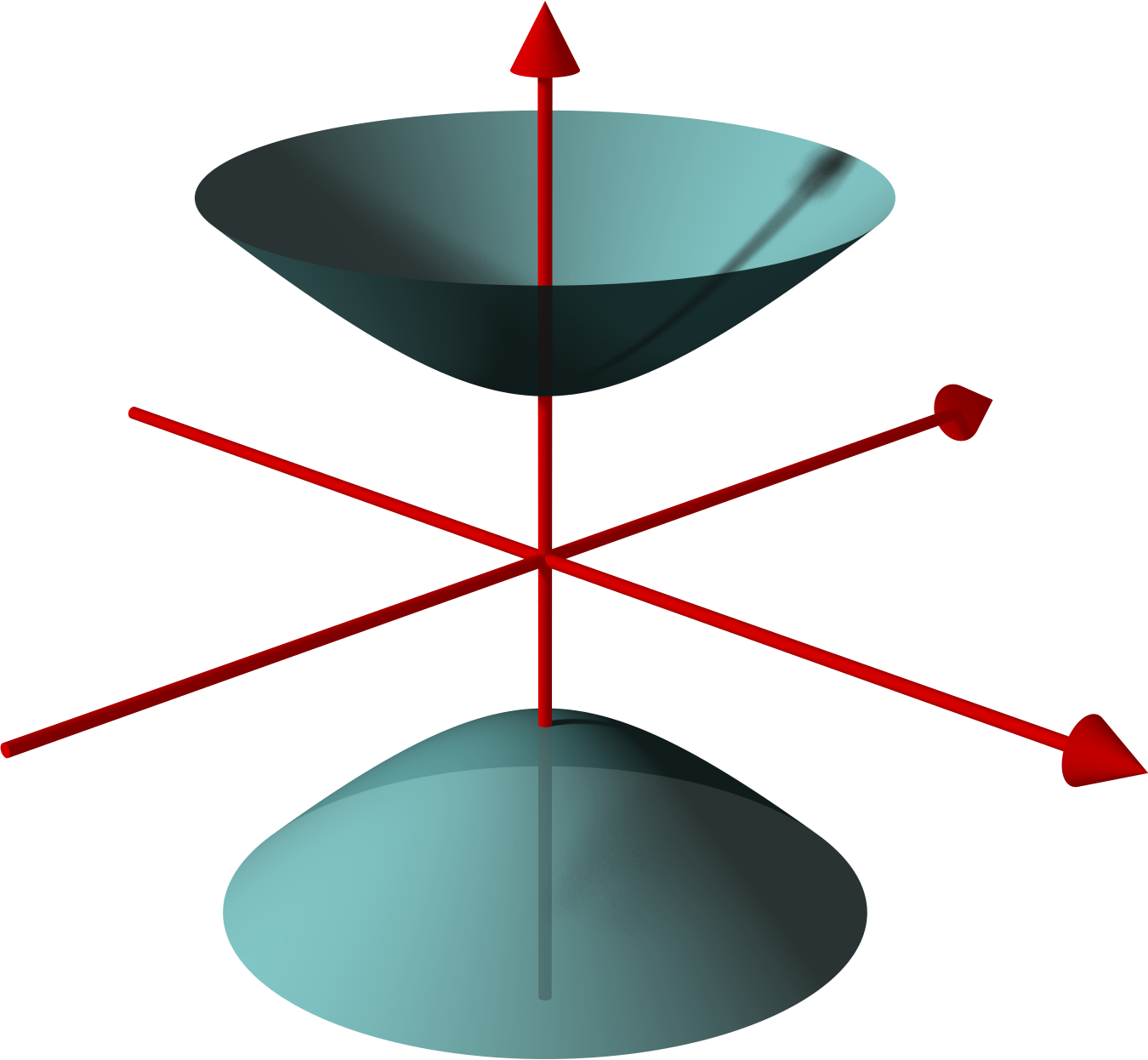
Hyperboloid of two sheets

== As trisectrix ==
Angle trisection with a parabola

A parabola can be used as a trisectrix, that is it allows the exact trisection of an arbitrary angle with straightedge and compass. This is not in contradiction to the impossibility of an angle trisection with compass-and-straightedge constructions alone, as the use of parabolas is not allowed in the classic rules for compass-and-straightedge constructions.

To trisect $\angle AOB$, place its leg $OB$ on the x axis such that the vertex $O$ is in the coordinate system's origin. The coordinate system also contains the parabola $y = 2x^2$. The unit circle with radius 1 around the origin intersects the angle's other leg $OA$, and from this point of intersection draw the perpendicular onto the y axis. The parallel to y axis through the midpoint of that perpendicular and the tangent on the unit circle in $(0, 1)$ intersect in $C$. The circle around $C$ with radius $OC$ intersects the parabola at $P_1$. The perpendicular from $P_1$ onto the x axis intersects the unit circle at $P_2$, and $\angle P_2OB$ is exactly one third of $\angle AOB$.

The correctness of this construction can be seen by showing that the x coordinate of $P_1$ is $\cos(\alpha)$. Solving the equation system given by the circle around $C$ and the parabola leads to the cubic equation $4x^3 - 3x - \cos(3\alpha) = 0$. The triple-angle formula $\cos(3\alpha) = 4 \cos(\alpha)^3 - 3 \cos(\alpha)$ then shows that $\cos(\alpha)$ is indeed a solution of that cubic equation.

This trisection goes back to René Descartes, who described it in his book La Géométrie (1637).

== Generalizations ==
If one replaces the real numbers by an arbitrary field, many geometric properties of the parabola $y = x^2$ are still valid:

1. A line intersects in at most two points.
2. At any point $(x_0, x_0^2)$ the line $y = 2 x_0 x - x_0^2$ is the tangent.

Essentially new phenomena arise, if the field has characteristic 2 (that is, $1 + 1 = 0$): the tangents are all parallel.

In algebraic geometry, the parabola is generalized by the rational normal curves, which have coordinates (x, x^{2}, x^{3}, ..., x^{n}); the standard parabola is the case n = 2, and the case n = 3 is known as the twisted cubic. A further generalization is given by the Veronese variety, when there is more than one input variable.

In the theory of quadratic forms, the parabola is the graph of the quadratic form x^{2} (or other scalings), while the elliptic paraboloid is the graph of the positive-definite quadratic form x^{2} + y^{2} (or scalings), and the hyperbolic paraboloid is the graph of the indefinite quadratic form x^{2} − y^{2}. Generalizations to more variables yield further such objects.

The curves y = x^{p} for other values of p are traditionally referred to as the higher parabolas and were originally treated implicitly, in the form x^{p} = ky^{q} for p and q both positive integers, in which form they are seen to be algebraic curves. These correspond to the explicit formula y = x^{p/q} for a positive fractional power of x. Negative fractional powers correspond to the implicit equation x^{p} y^{q} = k and are traditionally referred to as higher hyperbolas. Analytically, x can also be raised to an irrational power (for positive values of x); the analytic properties are analogous to when x is raised to rational powers, but the resulting curve is no longer algebraic and cannot be analyzed by algebraic geometry.

== In the physical world ==
In nature, approximations of parabolas and paraboloids are found in many diverse situations. The best-known instance of the parabola in the history of physics is the trajectory of a particle or body in motion under the influence of a uniform gravitational field without air resistance (for instance, a ball flying through the air, neglecting air friction).

The parabolic trajectory of projectiles was discovered experimentally in the early 17th century by Galileo, who performed experiments with balls rolling on inclined planes. He also later proved this mathematically in his book Dialogue Concerning Two New Sciences. (Note: However, this parabolic shape, as Newton recognized, is only an approximation of the actual elliptical shape of the trajectory and is obtained by assuming that the gravitational force is constant (not pointing toward the center of the Earth) in the area of interest. Often, this difference is negligible and leads to a simpler formula for tracking motion.) For objects extended in space, such as a diver jumping from a diving board, the object itself follows a complex motion as it rotates, but the center of mass of the object nevertheless moves along a parabola. As in all cases in the physical world, the trajectory is always an approximation of a parabola. The presence of air resistance, for example, always distorts the shape, although at low speeds, the shape is a good approximation of a parabola. At higher speeds, such as in ballistics, the shape is highly distorted and does not resemble a parabola.

Another hypothetical situation in which parabolas might arise, according to the theories of physics described in the 17th and 18th centuries by Sir Isaac Newton, is in two-body orbits, for example, the path of a small planetoid or other object under the influence of the gravitation of the Sun. Parabolic orbits do not occur in nature; simple orbits most commonly resemble hyperbolas or ellipses. The parabolic orbit is the degenerate intermediate case between those two types of ideal orbit. An object following a parabolic orbit would travel at the exact escape velocity of the object it orbits; objects in elliptical or hyperbolic orbits travel at less or greater than escape velocity, respectively. Long-period comets travel close to the Sun's escape velocity while they are moving through the inner Solar system, so their paths are nearly parabolic.

Approximations of parabolas are also found in the shape of the main cables on a simple suspension bridge. The curve of the chains of a suspension bridge is always an intermediate curve between a parabola and a catenary, but in practice the curve is generally nearer to a parabola due to the weight of the load (i.e. the road) being much larger than the cables themselves, and in calculations the second-degree polynomial formula of a parabola is used. Under the influence of a uniform load (such as a horizontal suspended deck), the otherwise catenary-shaped cable is deformed toward a parabola (see Catenary § Suspension bridge curve). Unlike an inelastic chain, a freely hanging spring of zero unstressed length takes the shape of a parabola. Suspension-bridge cables are, ideally, purely in tension, without having to carry other forces, for example, bending. Similarly, the structures of parabolic arches are purely in compression.

Paraboloids arise in several physical situations as well. The best-known instance is the parabolic reflector, which is a mirror or similar reflective device that concentrates light or other forms of electromagnetic radiation to a common focal point, or conversely, collimates light from a point source at the focus into a parallel beam. The principle of the parabolic reflector may have been discovered in the 3rd century BC by the geometer Archimedes, who, according to a dubious legend, constructed parabolic mirrors to defend Syracuse against the Roman fleet, by concentrating the sun's rays to set fire to the decks of the Roman ships. The principle was applied to telescopes in the 17th century. Today, paraboloid reflectors can be commonly observed throughout much of the world in microwave and satellite-dish receiving and transmitting antennas.

In parabolic microphones, a parabolic reflector is used to focus sound onto a microphone, giving it highly directional performance.

Paraboloids are also observed in the surface of a liquid confined to a container and rotated around the central axis. In this case, the centrifugal force causes the liquid to climb the walls of the container, forming a parabolic surface. This is the principle behind the liquid-mirror telescope.

Aircraft used to create a weightless state for purposes of experimentation, such as NASA's "Vomit Comet", follow a vertically parabolic trajectory for brief periods in order to trace the course of an object in free fall, which produces the same effect as zero gravity for most purposes.

=== Gallery ===
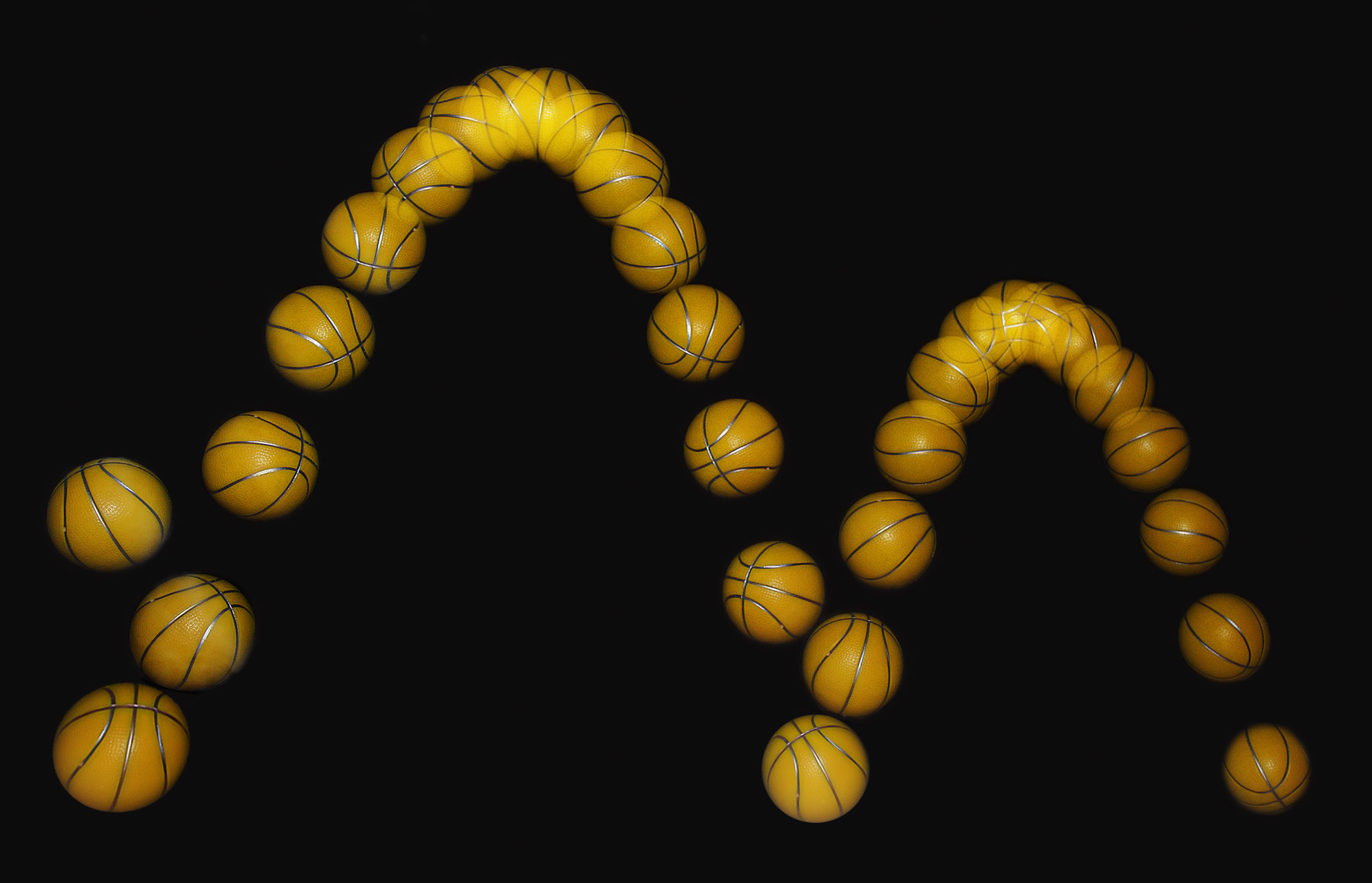
A bouncing ball captured with a stroboscopic flash at 25 images per second. The ball becomes significantly non-spherical after each bounce, especially after the first. That, along with spin and air resistance, causes the curve swept out to deviate slightly from the expected perfect parabola.

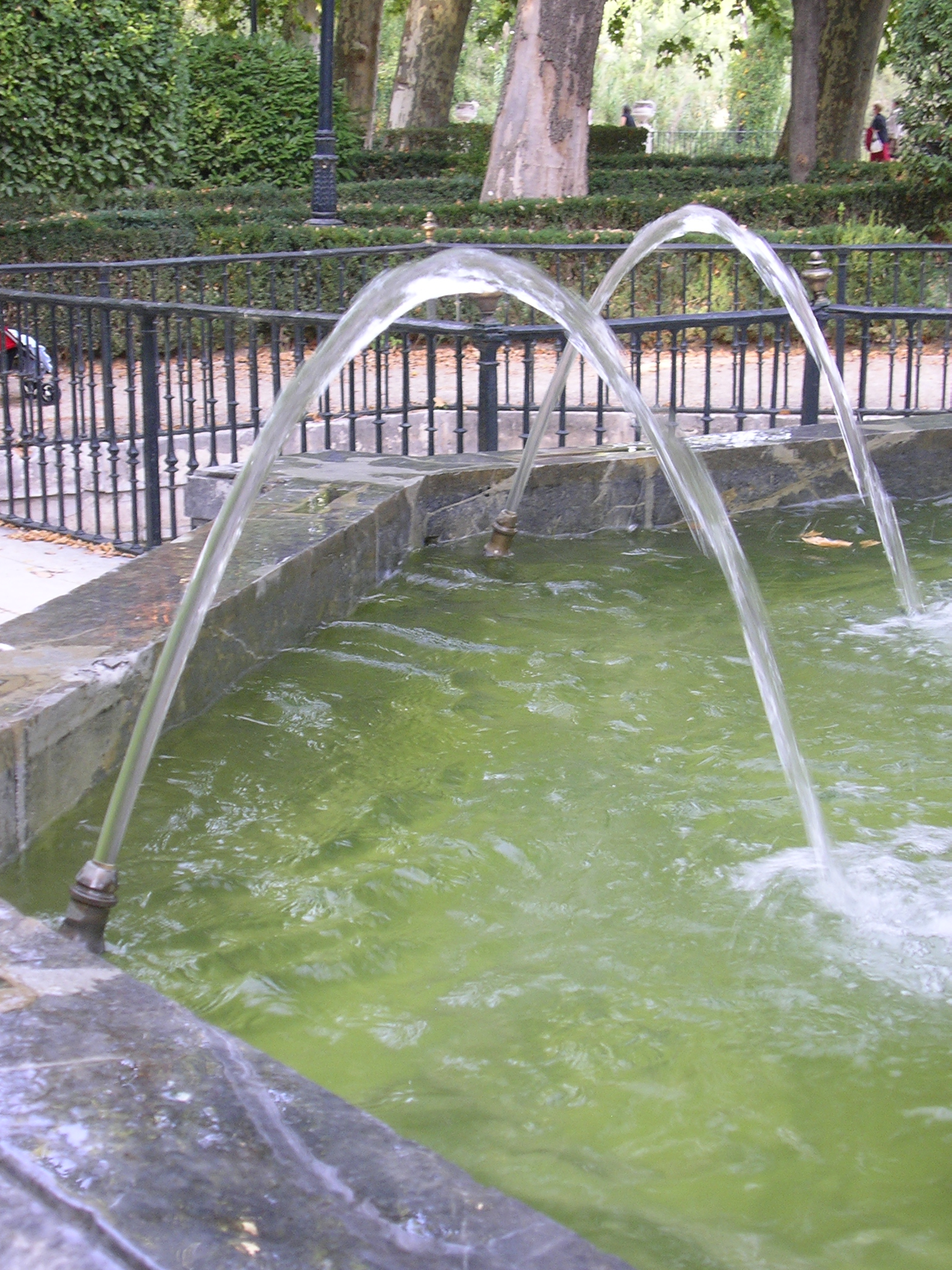
Parabolic trajectories of water in a fountain.

The path (in red) of Comet Kohoutek as it passed through the inner Solar system, showing its nearly parabolic shape. The blue orbit is the Earth's.

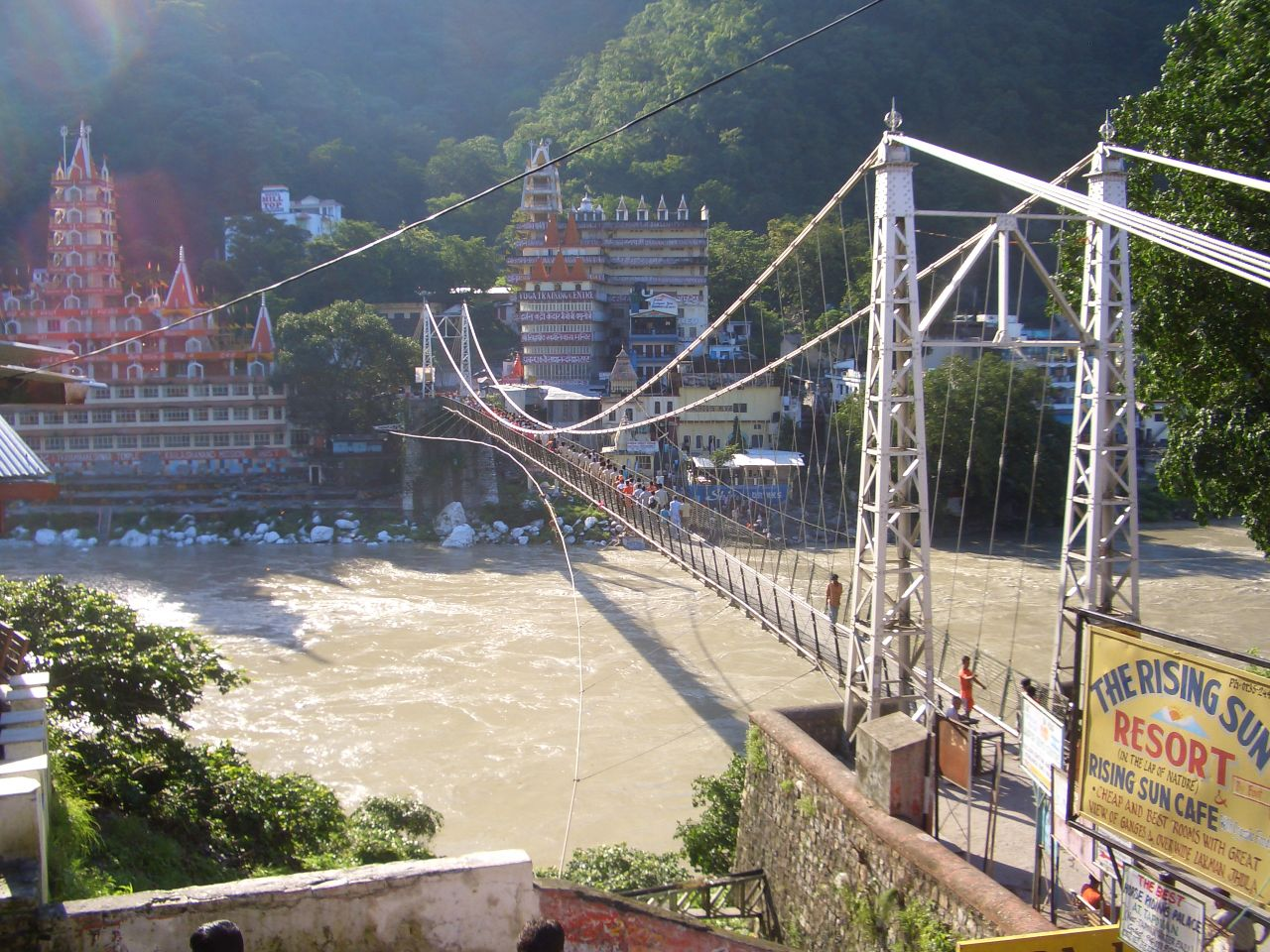
The supporting cables of suspension bridges follow a curve that is intermediate between a parabola and a catenary.

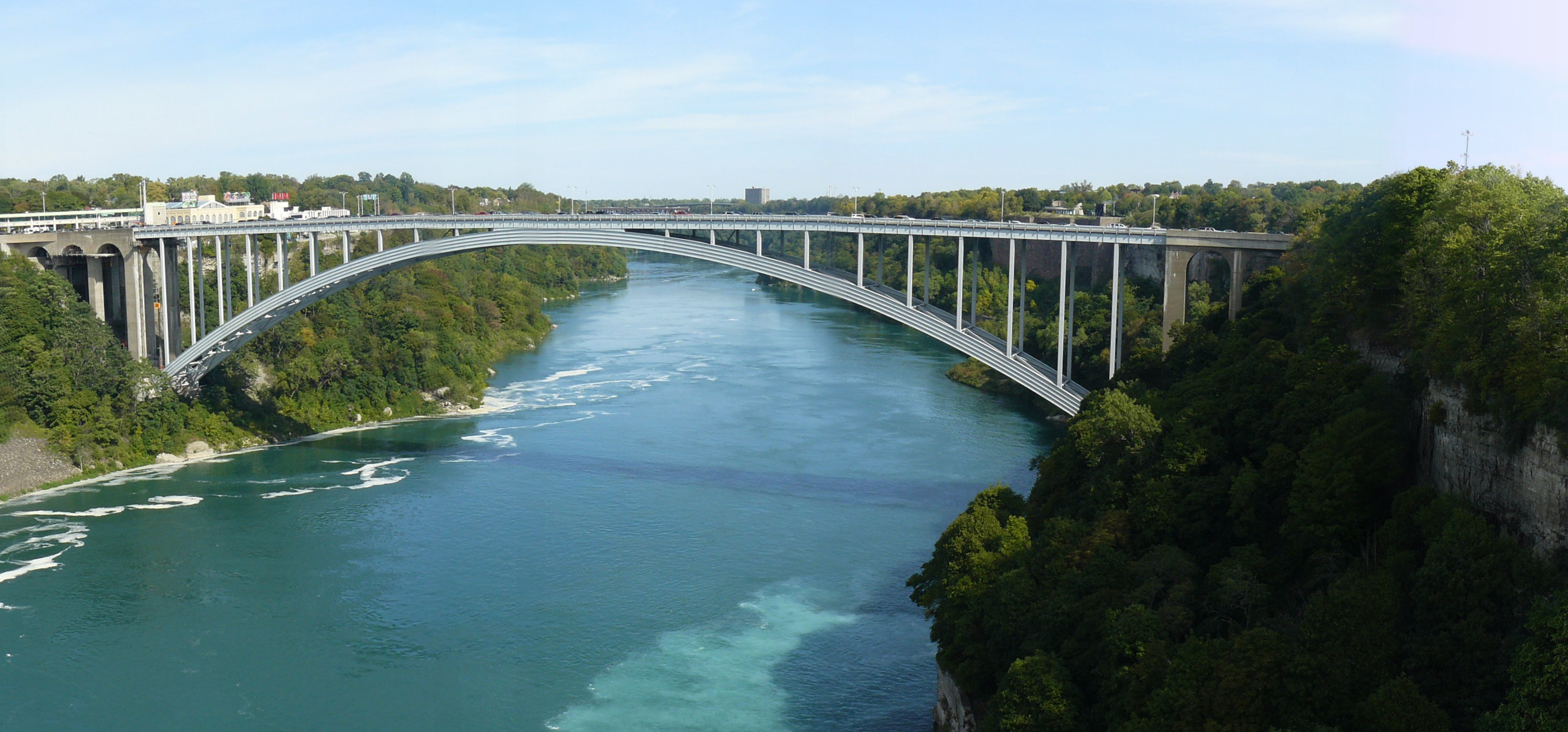
The Rainbow Bridge across the Niagara River, connecting Canada (left) to the United States (right). The parabolic arch is in compression and carries the weight of the road.

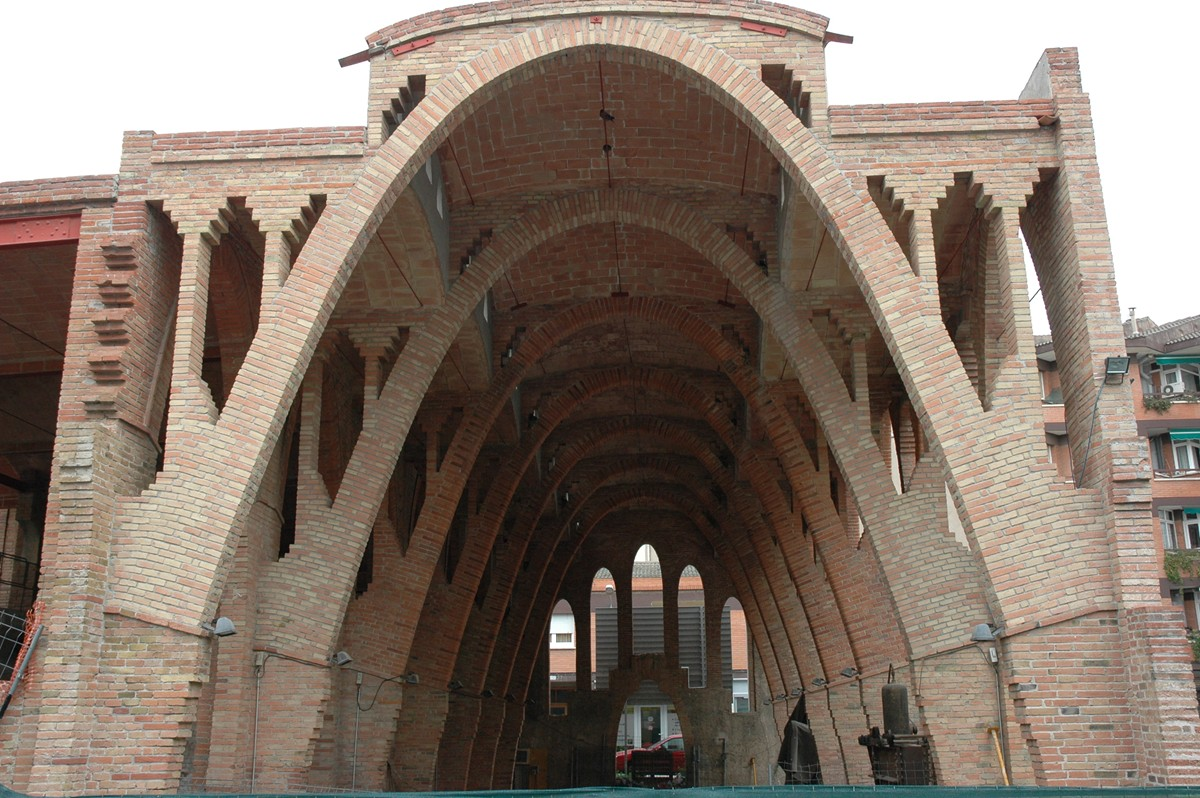
Parabolic arches used in architecture

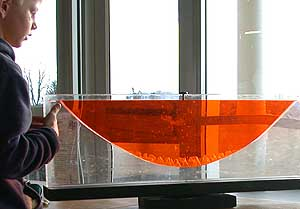
Parabolic shape formed by a liquid surface under rotation. Two liquids of different densities completely fill a narrow space between two sheets of transparent plastic. The gap between the sheets is closed at the bottom, sides and top. The whole assembly is rotating around a vertical axis passing through the centre. (See Rotating furnace)

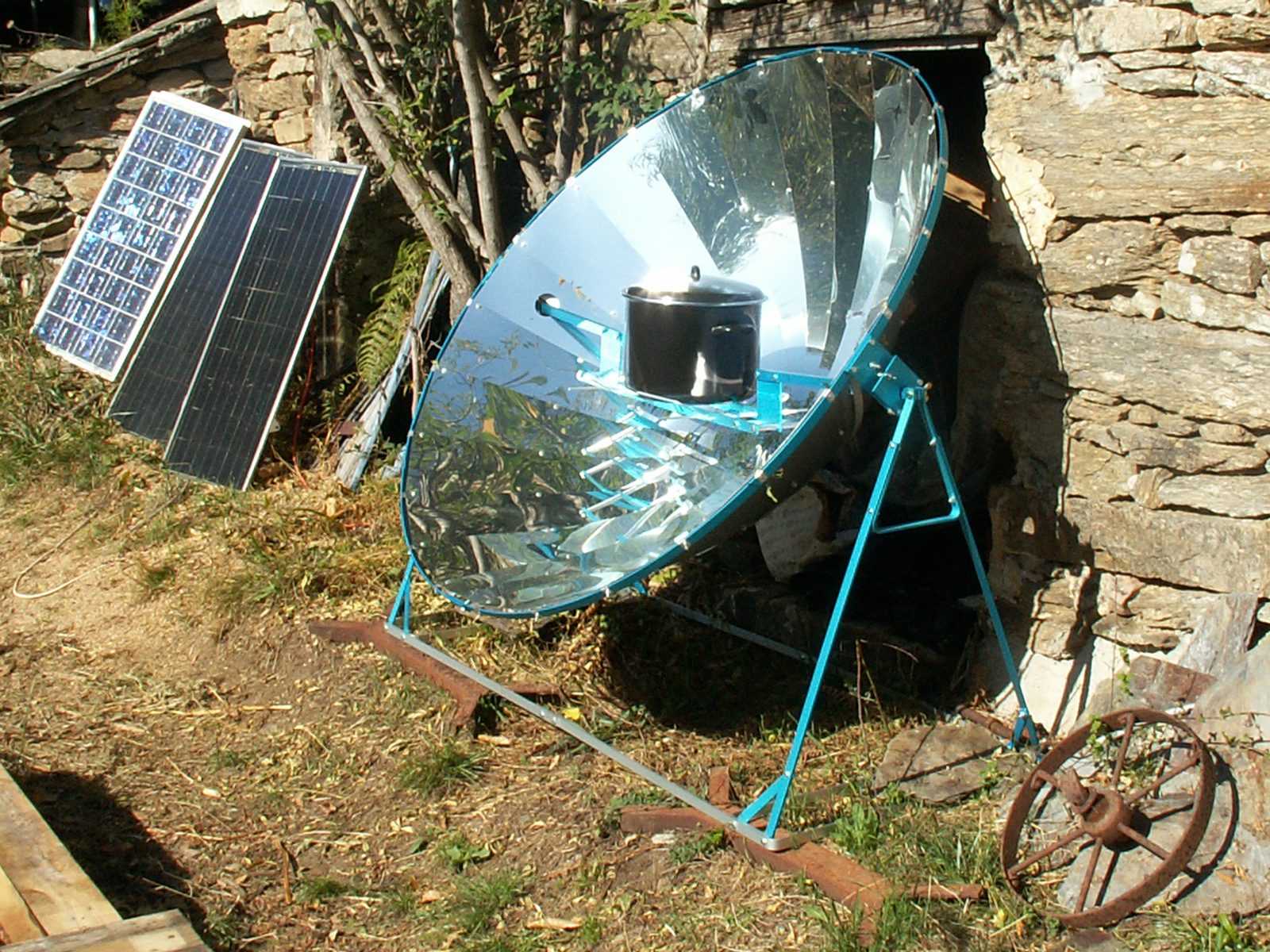
Solar cooker with parabolic reflector

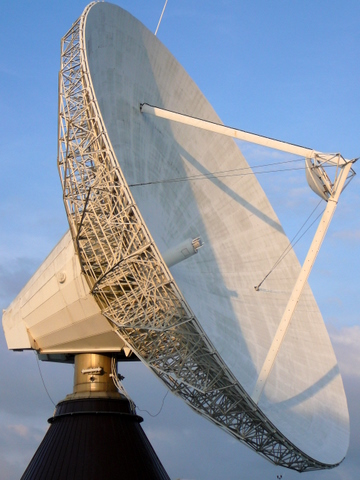
Parabolic antenna

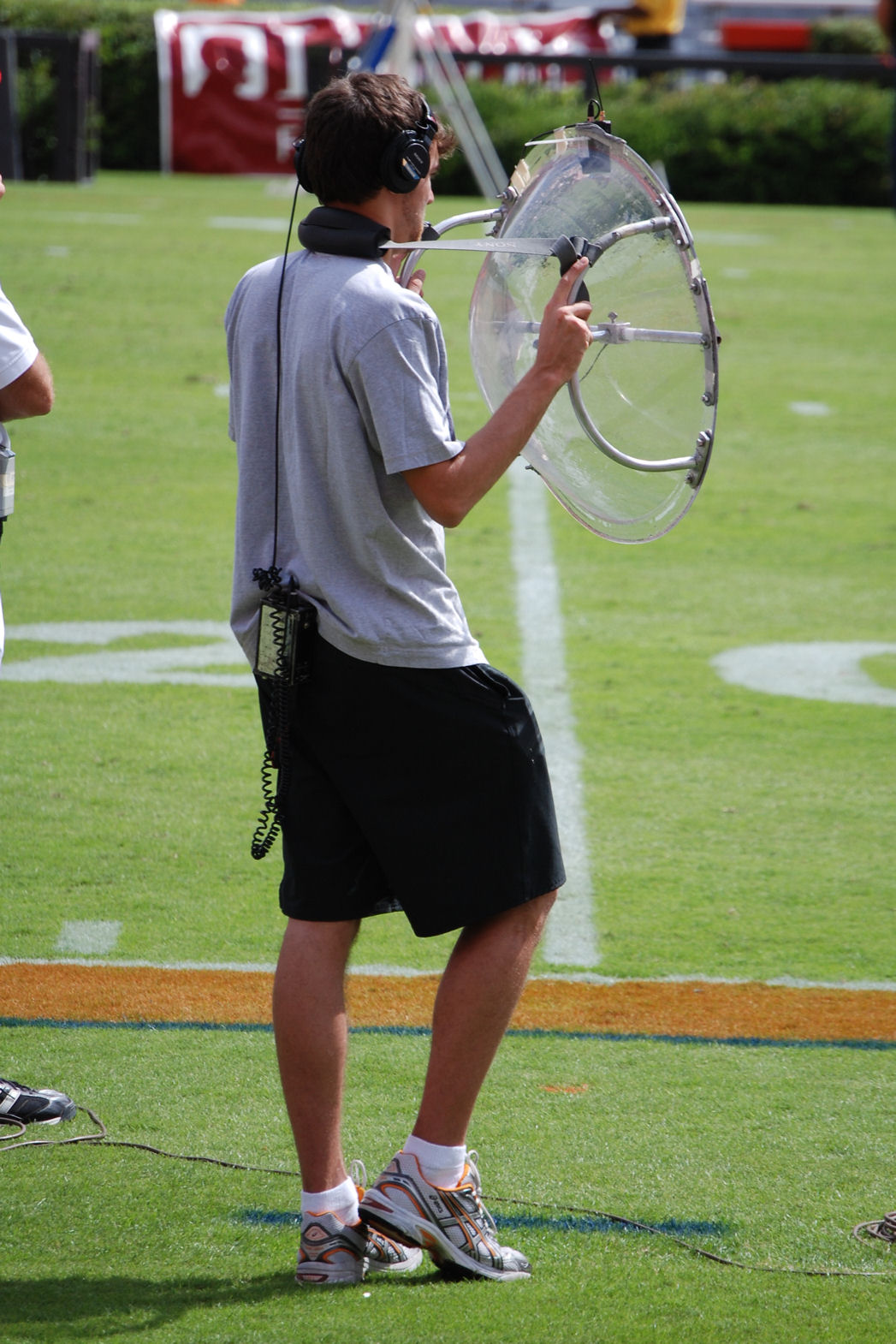
Parabolic microphone with optically transparent plastic reflector used at an American college football game.

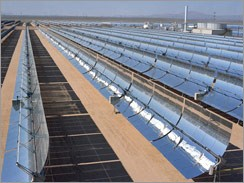
Array of parabolic troughs to collect solar energy

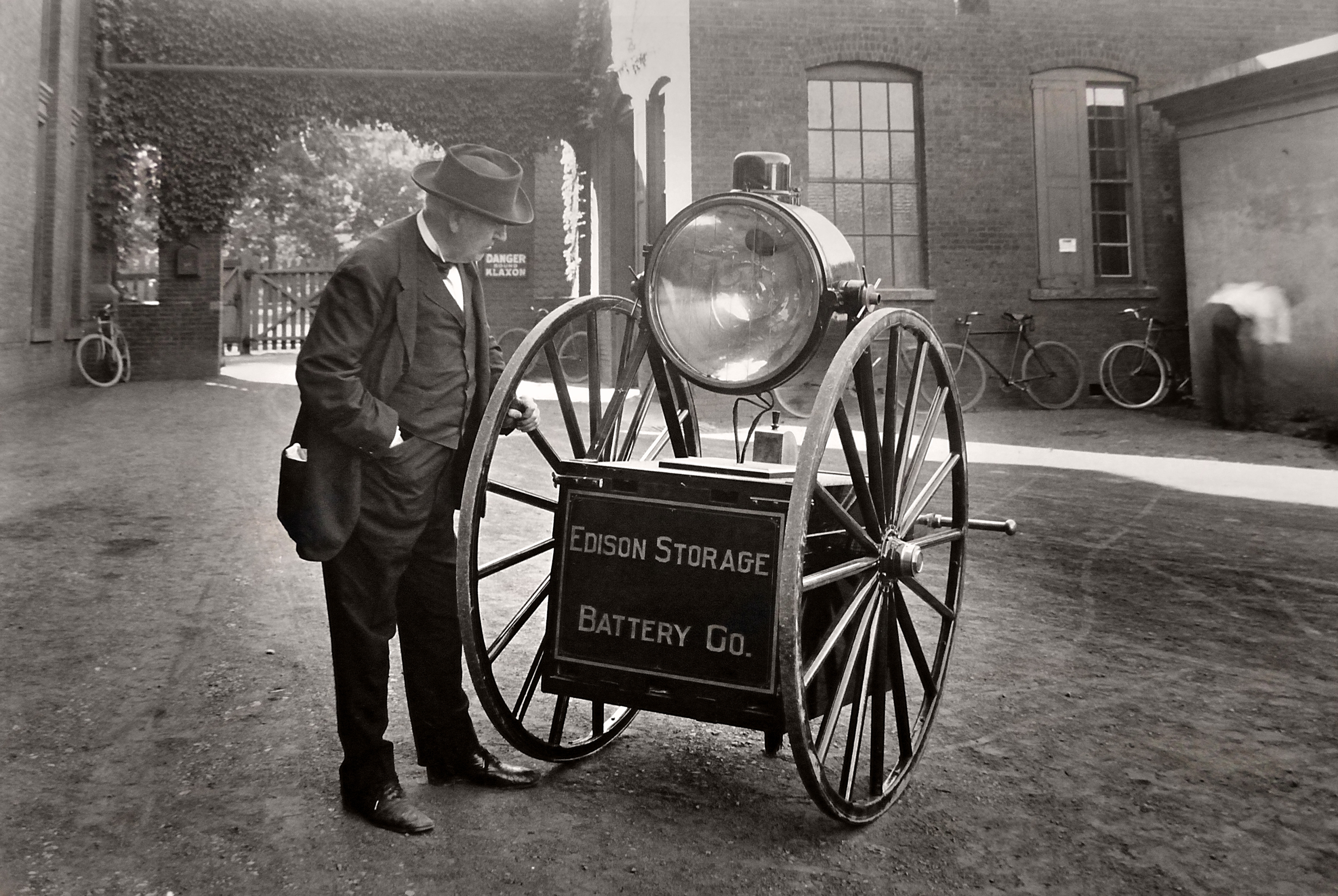
Edison's searchlight, mounted on a cart. The light had a parabolic reflector.

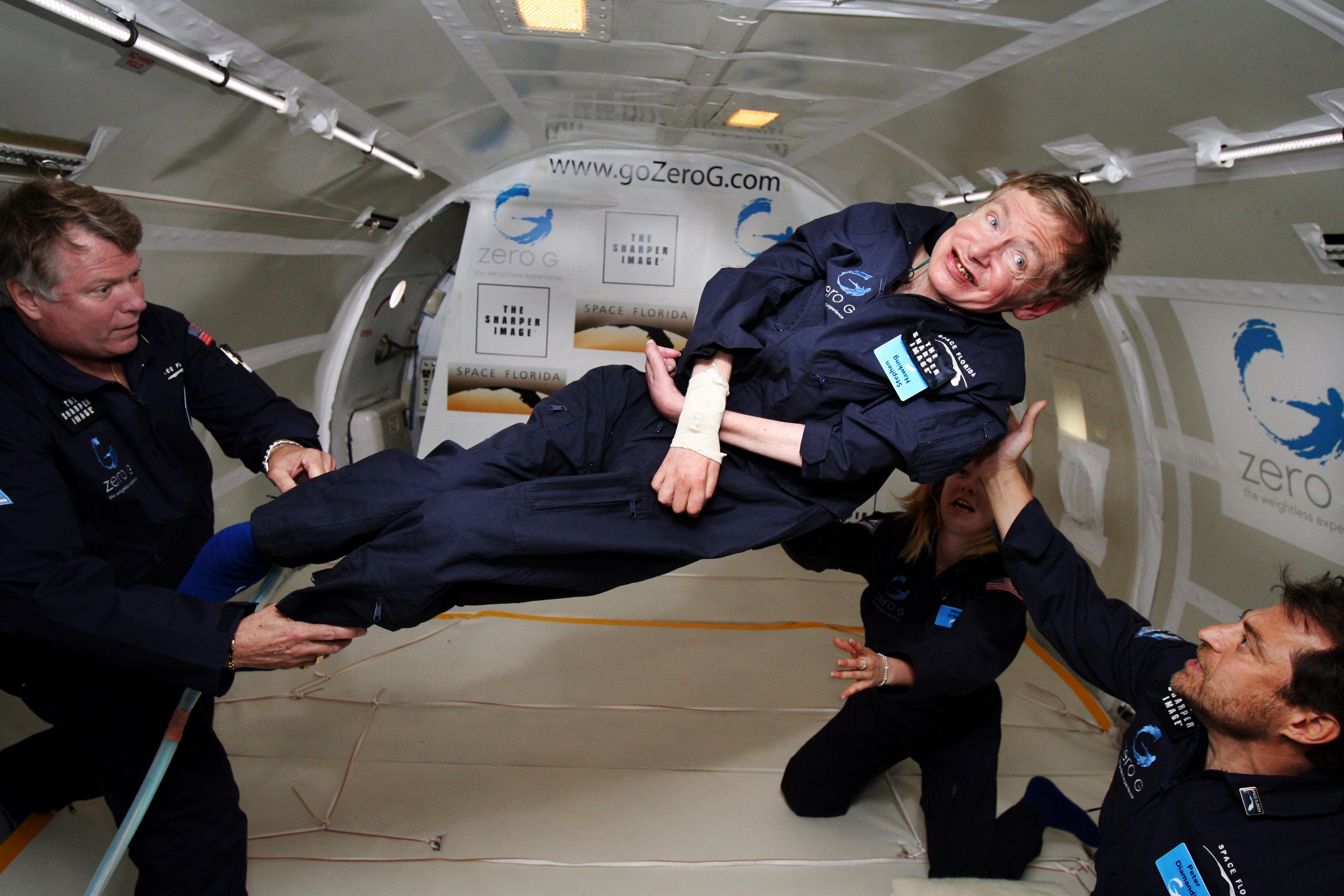
Physicist Stephen Hawking in an aircraft flying a parabolic trajectory to simulate zero gravity

== See also ==
- Confocal conic sections § Confocal parabolas
- Degenerate conic
- Dome § Paraboloid dome
- Parabolic partial differential equation
- Quadratic equation
- Quadratic function
- Universal parabolic constant
