= Directrix =

In mathematics, a directrix is a curve associated with a process generating a geometric object, such as:

- Directrix (conic section)
  - Directrix (ellipse)
- Directrix (generatrix)
- Directrix (rational normal scroll)

== Other uses ==
- Directrix is a spaceship in the Lensman series of novels by E. E. Smith.
- Directrix is the name of an indie alternative band in Chicago.
- Directrix - a feminine form of director in the context of grammatical gender.
