= Quadric (algebraic geometry) =

Subspace defined by a polynomial of degree 2 over a field

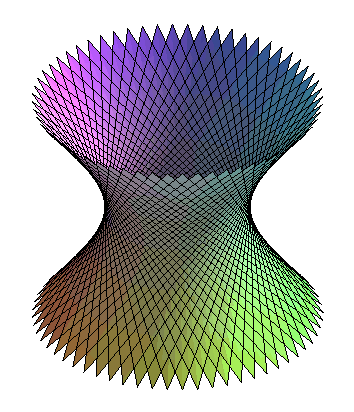
The two families of lines on a smooth (split) quadric surface

In the mathematical field of algebraic geometry, a quadric or quadric hypersurface is the subspace of N-dimensional space defined by a polynomial equation of degree 2 over a field. The theory is simplified by working in projective space rather than affine space. An example is the quadric surface $xy=zw$ in projective space ${\mathbf P}^3$ over the complex numbers C. A quadric has a natural action of the orthogonal group, and so the study of quadrics can be considered as a descendant of Euclidean geometry.

Many properties of quadrics hold more generally for projective homogeneous varieties. Another generalization of quadrics is provided by Fano varieties.

By definition, a quadric X of dimension n over a field k is the subspace of $\mathbf{P}^{n+1}$ defined by q = 0, where q is a nonzero homogeneous polynomial of degree 2 over k in variables $x_0,\ldots,x_{n+1}$. (A homogeneous polynomial is also called a form, and so q may be called a quadratic form.) If q is the product of two linear forms, then X is the union of two hyperplanes. It is common to assume that $n\geq 1$ and q is irreducible, which excludes that special case.

Here algebraic varieties over a field k are considered as a special class of schemes over k. When k is algebraically closed, one can also think of a projective variety in a more elementary way, as a subset of ${\mathbf P}^N(k)=(k^{N+1}-0)/k^*$ defined by homogeneous polynomial equations with coefficients in k.

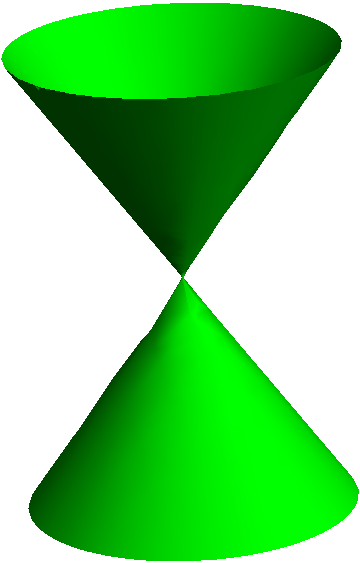
A singular quadric surface, the cone over a smooth conic curve

If q can be written (after some linear change of coordinates) as a polynomial in a proper subset of the variables, then X is the projective cone over a lower-dimensional quadric. It is reasonable to focus attention on the case where X is not a cone. For k of characteristic not 2, X is not a cone if and only if X is smooth over k. When k has characteristic not 2, smoothness of a quadric is also equivalent to the Hessian matrix of q having nonzero determinant, or to the associated bilinear form b(x,y) = q(x+y) – q(x) – q(y) being nondegenerate. In general, for k of characteristic not 2, the rank of a quadric means the rank of the Hessian matrix. A quadric of rank r is an iterated cone over a smooth quadric of dimension r − 2.

It is a fundamental result that a smooth quadric over a field k is rational over k if and only if X has a k-rational point. That is, if there is a solution of the equation q = 0 of the form $(a_0,\ldots,a_{n+1})$ with $a_0,\ldots,a_{n+1}$ in k, not all zero (hence corresponding to a point in projective space), then there is a one-to-one correspondence defined by rational functions over k between ${\mathbf P}^n$ minus a lower-dimensional subset and X minus a lower-dimensional subset. For example, if k is infinite, it follows that if X has one k-rational point then it has infinitely many. This equivalence is proved by stereographic projection. In particular, every quadric over an algebraically closed field is rational.

A quadric over a field k is called isotropic if it has a k-rational point. An example of an anisotropic quadric is the quadric

$$x_0^2+x_1^2+\cdots+x_{n+1}^2=0$$

in projective space ${\mathbf P}^{n+1}$ over the real numbers R.

== Linear subspaces of quadrics ==
A central part of the geometry of quadrics is the study of the linear spaces that they contain. (In the context of projective geometry, a linear subspace of ${\mathbf P}^N$ is isomorphic to ${\mathbf P}^a$ for some $a\leq N$.) A key point is that every linear space contained in a smooth quadric has dimension at most half the dimension of the quadric. Moreover, when k is algebraically closed, this is an optimal bound, meaning that every smooth quadric of dimension n over k contains a linear subspace of dimension $\lfloor n/2\rfloor$.

Over any field k, a smooth quadric of dimension n is called split if it contains a linear space of dimension $\lfloor n/2\rfloor$ over k. Thus every smooth quadric over an algebraically closed field is split. If a quadric X over a field k is split, then it can be written (after a linear change of coordinates) as

$$x_0x_1+x_2x_3+\cdots+x_{2m-2}x_{2m-1}+x_{2m}^2=0$$

if X has dimension 2m − 1, or

$$x_0x_1+x_2x_3+\cdots+x_{2m}x_{2m+1}=0$$

if X has dimension 2m. In particular, over an algebraically closed field, there is only one smooth quadric of each dimension, up to isomorphism.

For many applications, it is important to describe the space Y of all linear subspaces of maximal dimension in a given smooth quadric X. (For clarity, assume that X is split over k.) A striking phenomenon is that Y is connected if X has odd dimension, whereas it has two connected components if X has even dimension. That is, there are two different "types" of maximal linear spaces in X when X has even dimension. The two families can be described by: for a smooth quadric X of dimension 2m, fix one m-plane Q contained in X. Then the two types of m-planes P contained in X are distinguished by whether the dimension of the intersection $P\cap Q$ is even or odd. (The dimension of the empty set is taken to be −1 here.)

== Low-dimensional quadrics ==
Let X be a split quadric over a field k. (In particular, X can be any smooth quadric over an algebraically closed field.) In low dimensions, X and the linear spaces it contains can be described as follows.

- A quadric curve in $\mathbf{P}^2$ is called a conic. A split conic over k is isomorphic to the projective line $\mathbf{P}^1$ over k, embedded in $\mathbf{P}^2$ by the 2nd Veronese embedding. (For example, ellipses, parabolas and hyperbolas are different kinds of conics in the affine plane over R, but their closures in the projective plane are all isomorphic to $\mathbf{P}^1$ over R.)
- A split quadric surface X is isomorphic to $\mathbf{P}^1\times \mathbf{P}^1$, embedded in $\mathbf{P}^3$ by the Segre embedding. The space of lines in the quadric surface X has two connected components, each isomorphic to $\mathbf{P}^1$.
- A split quadric 3-fold X can be viewed as an isotropic Grassmannian for the symplectic group Sp(4,k). (This is related to the exceptional isomorphism of linear algebraic groups between SO(5,k) and $\operatorname{Sp}(4,k)/\{\pm 1\}$.) Namely, given a 4-dimensional vector space V with a symplectic form, the quadric 3-fold X can be identified with the space LGr(2,4) of 2-planes in V on which the form restricts to zero. Furthermore, the space of lines in the quadric 3-fold X is isomorphic to $\mathbf{P}^3$.
- A split quadric 4-fold X can be viewed as the Grassmannian Gr(2,4), the space of 2-planes in a 4-dimensional vector space (or equivalently, of lines in $\mathbf{P}^3$). (This is related to the exceptional isomorphism of linear algebraic groups between SO(6,k) and $\operatorname{SL}(4,k)/\{\pm 1\}$.) The space of 2-planes in the quadric 4-fold X has two connected components, each isomorphic to $\mathbf{P}^3$.
- The space of 2-planes in a split quadric 5-fold is isomorphic to a split quadric 6-fold. Likewise, both components of the space of 3-planes in a split quadric 6-fold are isomorphic to a split quadric 6-fold. (This is related to the phenomenon of triality for the group Spin(8).)

As these examples suggest, the space of m-planes in a split quadric of dimension 2m always has two connected components, each isomorphic to the isotropic Grassmannian of (m − 1)-planes in a split quadric of dimension 2m − 1. Any reflection in the orthogonal group maps one component isomorphically to the other.

== The Bruhat decomposition ==
A smooth quadric over a field k is a projective homogeneous variety for the orthogonal group (and for the special orthogonal group), viewed as linear algebraic groups over k. Like any projective homogeneous variety for a split reductive group, a split quadric X has an algebraic cell decomposition, known as the Bruhat decomposition. (In particular, this applies to every smooth quadric over an algebraically closed field.) That is, X can be written as a finite union of disjoint subsets that are isomorphic to affine spaces over k of various dimensions. (For projective homogeneous varieties, the cells are called Schubert cells, and their closures are called Schubert varieties.) Cellular varieties are very special among all algebraic varieties. For example, a cellular variety is rational, and (for k = C) the Hodge theory of a smooth projective cellular variety is trivial, in the sense that $h^{p,q}(X)=0$ for $p\neq q$. For a cellular variety, the Chow group of algebraic cycles on X is the free abelian group on the set of cells, as is the integral homology of X (if k = C).

A split quadric X of dimension n has only one cell of each dimension r, except in the middle dimension of an even-dimensional quadric, where there are two cells. The corresponding cell closures (Schubert varieties) are:

- For $0\leq r<n/2$, a linear space $\mathbf{P}^r$ contained in X.
- For r = n/2, both Schubert varieties are linear spaces $\mathbf{P}^r$ contained in X, one from each of the two families of middle-dimensional linear spaces (as described above).
- For $n/2<r\leq n$, the Schubert variety of dimension r is the intersection of X with a linear space of dimension r + 1 in $\mathbf{P}^{n+1}$; so it is an r-dimensional quadric. It is the iterated cone over a smooth quadric of dimension 2r − n.

Using the Bruhat decomposition, it is straightforward to compute the Chow ring of a split quadric of dimension n over a field, as follows. When the base field is the complex numbers, this is also the integral cohomology ring of a smooth quadric, with $CH^j$ mapping isomorphically to $H^{2j}$. (The cohomology in odd degrees is zero.)

- For n = 2m − 1, $CH^*(X)\cong \Z[h,l]/(h^m-2l, l^2)$, where |h| = 1 and |l| = m.
- For n = 2m, $CH^*(X)\cong \Z[h,l]/(h^{m+1}-2hl, l^2-ah^ml)$, where |h| = 1 and |l| = m, and a is 0 for m odd and 1 for m even.

Here h is the class of a hyperplane section and l is the class of a maximal linear subspace of X. (For n = 2m, the class of the other type of maximal linear subspace is $h^m-l$.) This calculation shows the importance of the linear subspaces of a quadric: the Chow ring of all algebraic cycles on X is generated by the "obvious" element h (pulled back from the class $c_1O(1)$ of a hyperplane in ${\mathbf P}^{n+1}$) together with the class of a maximal linear subspace of X.

== Isotropic Grassmannians and the projective pure spinor variety ==
The space of r-planes in a smooth n-dimensional quadric (like the quadric itself) is a projective homogeneous variety, known as the isotropic Grassmannian or orthogonal Grassmannian OGr(r + 1, n + 2). (The numbering refers to the dimensions of the corresponding vector spaces. In the case of middle-dimensional linear subspaces of a quadric of even dimension 2m, one writes $\operatorname{OGr}_{+}(m+1,2m+2)$ for one of the two connected components.) As a result, the isotropic Grassmannians of a split quadric over a field also have algebraic cell decompositions.

The isotropic Grassmannian W = OGr(m,2m + 1) of (m − 1)-planes in a smooth quadric of dimension 2m − 1 may also be viewed as the variety of Projective pure spinors, or simple spinor variety, of dimension m(m + 1)/2. (Another description of the pure spinor variety is as $\operatorname{OGr}_{+}(m+1,2m+2)$.) To explain the name: the smallest SO(2m + 1)-equivariant projective embedding of W lands in projective space of dimension $2^m-1$. The action of SO(2m + 1) on this projective space does not come from a linear representation of SO(2m+1) over k, but rather from a representation of its simply connected double cover, the spin group Spin(2m + 1) over k. This is called the spin representation of Spin(2m + 1), of dimension $2^m$.

Over the complex numbers, the isotropic Grassmannian OGr(r + 1, n + 2) of r-planes in an n-dimensional quadric X is a homogeneous space for the complex algebraic group $G=\operatorname{SO}(n+2,\mathbf{C})$, and also for its maximal compact subgroup, the compact Lie group SO(n + 2). From the latter point of view, this isotropic Grassmannian is

$$\operatorname{SO}(n+2)/(\operatorname{U}(r+1)\times \operatorname{SO}(n-2r)),$$

where U(r+1) is the unitary group. For r = 0, the isotropic Grassmannian is the quadric itself, which can therefore be viewed as

$$\operatorname{SO}(n+2)/(\operatorname{U}(1)\times \operatorname{SO}(n)).$$

For example, the complex projectivized pure spinor variety OGr(m, 2m + 1) can be viewed as SO(2m + 1)/U(m), and also as SO(2m+2)/U(m+1). These descriptions can be used to compute the cohomology ring (or equivalently the Chow ring) of the spinor variety:

$$CH^*\operatorname{OGr}(m,2m+1)\cong \Z[e_1,\ldots,e_m]/(e_j^2-2e_{j-1}e_{j+1}+2e_{j-2}e_{j+2}-\cdots+(-1)^je_{2j}=0\text{ for all }j),$$

where the Chern classes $c_j$ of the natural rank-m vector bundle are equal to $2e_j$. Here $e_j$ is understood to mean 0 for j > m.

== Spinor bundles on quadrics ==
The spinor bundles play a special role among all vector bundles on a quadric, analogous to the maximal linear subspaces among all subvarieties of a quadric. To describe these bundles, let X be a split quadric of dimension n over a field k. The special orthogonal group SO(n+2) over k acts on X, and therefore so does its double cover, the spin group G = Spin(n+2) over k. In these terms, X is a homogeneous space G/P, where P is a maximal parabolic subgroup of G. The semisimple part of P is the spin group Spin(n), and there is a standard way to extend the spin representations of Spin(n) to representations of P. (There are two spin representations $V_{+}, V_{-}$ for n = 2m, each of dimension $2^{m-1}$, and one spin representation V for n = 2m − 1, of dimension $2^{m-1}$.) Then the spinor bundles on the quadric X = G/P are defined as the G-equivariant vector bundles associated to these representations of P. So there are two spinor bundles $S_{+},S_{-}$ of rank $2^{m-1}$ for n = 2m, and one spinor bundle S of rank $2^{m-1}$ for n = 2m − 1. For n even, any reflection in the orthogonal group switches the two spinor bundles on X.

For example, the two spinor bundles on a quadric surface $X\cong \mathbf{P}^1\times\mathbf{P}^1$ are the line bundles O(−1,0) and O(0,−1). The spinor bundle on a quadric 3-fold X is the natural rank-2 subbundle on X viewed as the isotropic Grassmannian of 2-planes in a 4-dimensional symplectic vector space.

To indicate the significance of the spinor bundles: Mikhail Kapranov showed that the bounded derived category of coherent sheaves on a split quadric X over a field k has a full exceptional collection involving the spinor bundles, along with the "obvious" line bundles O(j) restricted from projective space:

$$D^b(X)=\langle S_{+},S_{-},O,O(1),\ldots,O(n-1)\rangle$$

if n is even, and

$$D^b(X)=\langle S,O,O(1),\ldots,O(n-1)\rangle$$

if n is odd. Concretely, this implies the split case of Richard Swan's calculation of the Grothendieck group of algebraic vector bundles on a smooth quadric; it is the free abelian group

$$K_0(X)=\Z\{S_{+},S_{-},O,O(1),\ldots,O(n-1)\}$$

for n even, and

$$K_0(X)=\Z\{S,O,O(1),\ldots,O(n-1)\}$$

for n odd. When k = C, the topological K-group $K^0(X)$ (of continuous complex vector bundles on the quadric X) is given by the same formula, and $K^1(X)$ is zero.
