= Rational normal curve =

In mathematics, the rational normal curve is a smooth, rational curve C of degree n in projective n-space P^{n}. It is a simple example of a projective variety; formally, it is the Veronese variety when the domain is the projective line. For n = 2 it is the plane conic Z_{0}Z_{2} = Z^{2}_{1}, and for n = 3 it is the twisted cubic. The term "normal" refers to projective normality, not normal schemes. The intersection of the rational normal curve with an affine space is called the moment curve.

== Definition ==
The rational normal curve may be given parametrically as the image of the map

$$\nu:\mathbf{P}^1\to\mathbf{P}^n$$

which assigns to the homogeneous coordinates [S : T] the value

$$\nu:[S:T] \mapsto \left [S^n:S^{n-1}T:S^{n-2}T^2:\cdots:T^n \right ].$$

In the affine coordinates of the chart x_{0} ≠ 0 the map is simply

$$\nu:x \mapsto \left (x, x^2, \ldots, x^n \right ).$$

That is, the rational normal curve is the closure by a single point at infinity of the affine curve

$$\left (x, x^2, \ldots, x^n \right ).$$

Equivalently, rational normal curve may be understood to be a projective variety, defined as the common zero locus of the homogeneous polynomials

$$F_{i,j} \left (X_0, \ldots, X_n \right ) = X_iX_j - X_{i+1}X_{j-1}$$

where $[X_0: \cdots: X_n]$ are the homogeneous coordinates on P^{n}. The full set of these polynomials is not needed; it is sufficient to pick n of these to specify the curve.

== Alternate parameterization ==
Let $[a_i:b_i]$ be n + 1 distinct points in P^{1}. Then the polynomial

$$G(S,T) = \prod_{i=0}^n \left (a_iS -b_iT \right )$$

is a homogeneous polynomial of degree n + 1 with distinct roots. The polynomials

$$H_i(S,T) = \frac{G(S,T)} {(a_iS-b_iT)}$$

are then a basis for the space of homogeneous polynomials of degree n. The map

$$[S:T] \mapsto \left [H_0(S,T) : H_1(S,T) : \cdots : H_n (S,T) \right ]$$

or, equivalently, dividing by G(S, T)

$$[S:T] \mapsto \left[\frac{1}{(a_0S-b_0T)} : \cdots : \frac{1}{(a_nS-b_nT)}\right]$$

is a rational normal curve. That this is a rational normal curve may be understood by noting that the monomials

$$S^n,S^{n-1}T,S^{n-2}T^2,\cdots,T^n,$$

are just one possible basis for the space of degree n homogeneous polynomials. In fact, any basis will do. This is just an application of the statement that any two projective varieties are projectively equivalent if they are congruent modulo the projective linear group PGL_{n + 1}(K) (with K the field over which the projective space is defined).

This rational curve sends the zeros of G to each of the coordinate points of P^{n}; that is, all but one of the H_{i} vanish for a zero of G. Conversely, any rational normal curve passing through the n + 1 coordinate points may be written parametrically in this way.

== Properties ==
The rational normal curve has an assortment of nice properties:

- Any n + 1 points on C are linearly independent, and span P^{n}. This property distinguishes the rational normal curve from all other curves.
- Given n + 3 points in P^{n} in linear general position (that is, with no n + 1 lying in a hyperplane), there is a unique rational normal curve passing through them. The curve may be explicitly specified using the parametric representation, by arranging n + 1 of the points to lie on the coordinate axes, and then mapping the other two points to [S : T] = [0 : 1] and [S : T] = [1 : 0].
- The tangent and secant lines of a rational normal curve are pairwise disjoint, except at points of the curve itself. This is a property shared by sufficiently positive embeddings of any projective variety.
- There are

$$\binom{n+2}{2}-2n-1$$

independent quadrics that generate the ideal of the curve.

- The curve is not a complete intersection, for n > 2. That is, it cannot be defined (as a subscheme of projective space) by only n − 1 equations, that being the codimension of the curve in $\mathbf{P}^n$.
- The canonical mapping for a hyperelliptic curve has image a rational normal curve, and is 2-to-1.
- Every irreducible non-degenerate curve C ⊂ P^{n} of degree n is a rational normal curve.

== See also ==
- Rational normal scroll
