= Fyodor Zak =

Russian mathematician

Fyodor L. Zak (Russian: Федор Лазаревич Зак (born December 2, 1949) is a Russian mathematician working on mathematical economics and algebraic geometry who classified the Scorza varieties.

== Publications ==
- Zak, F. L. (1993), Tangents and secants of algebraic varieties, Translations of Mathematical Monographs, vol. 127, Providence, R.I.: American Mathematical Society, ISBN 978-0-8218-4585-1, MR 1234494
