= Normal scheme =

Concept in algebraic geometry

In algebraic geometry, an algebraic variety or scheme X is normal if it is normal at every point, meaning that the local ring at the point is an integrally closed domain. An affine variety X (understood to be irreducible) is normal if and only if the ring O(X) of regular functions on X is an integrally closed domain. A variety X over a field is normal if and only if every finite birational morphism from any variety Y to X is an isomorphism.

Normal varieties were introduced by Zariski.

== Geometric and algebraic interpretations of normality ==
A morphism of varieties is finite if the inverse image of every point is finite and the morphism is proper. A morphism of varieties is birational if it restricts to an isomorphism between dense open subsets. So, for example, the cuspidal cubic curve X in the affine plane A^{2} defined by x^{2} = y^{3} is not normal, because there is a finite birational morphism A^{1} → X (namely, t maps to (t^{3}, t^{2})) which is not an isomorphism. By contrast, the affine line A^{1} is normal: it cannot be simplified any further by finite birational morphisms.

A normal complex variety X has the property, when viewed as a stratified space using the classical topology, that every link is connected. Equivalently, every complex point x has arbitrarily small neighborhoods U such that U minus the singular set of X is connected. For example, it follows that the nodal cubic curve X in the figure, defined by y^{2} = x^{2}(x + 1), is not normal. This also follows from the definition of normality, since there is a finite birational morphism from A^{1} to X which is not an isomorphism; it sends two points of A^{1} to the same point in X.

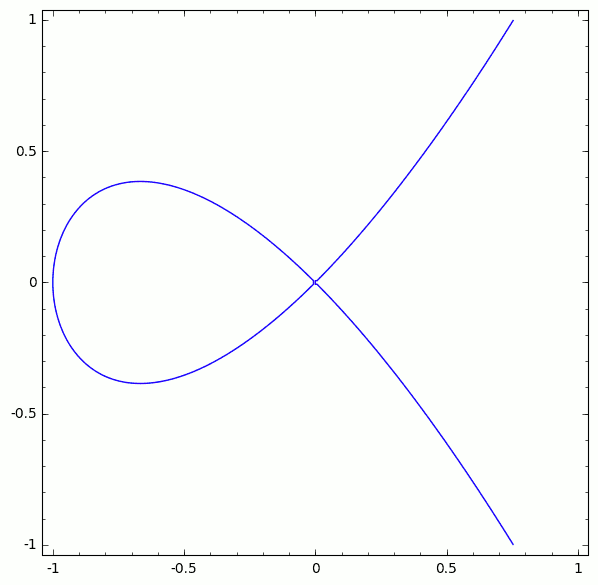
Curve y^{2} = x^{2}(x + 1)

More generally, a scheme X is normal if each of its local rings

O_{X,x}

is an integrally closed domain. That is, each of these rings is an integral domain R, and every ring S with R ⊆ S ⊆ Frac(R) such that S is finitely generated as an R-module is equal to R. (Here Frac(R) denotes the field of fractions of R.) This is a direct translation, in terms of local rings, of the geometric condition that every finite birational morphism to X is an isomorphism. For instance, in the case of the nodal cubic X in the figure, the local ring $A = \left(k[x,y]/(y^2 - x^2(x+1))\right)_{(x,y)}$ is not integrally closed in its field of fractions, since y/x is integral over A but is not in A. Therefore X is not normal at the point (0,0).

An older notion is that a subvariety X of projective space is linearly normal if the linear system giving the embedding is complete. Equivalently, X ⊆ P^{n} is not the linear projection of an embedding X ⊆ P^{n+1} (unless X is contained in a hyperplane P^{n}). This is the meaning of "normal" in the phrases rational normal curve and rational normal scroll.

Every regular scheme is normal. Conversely, Zariski showed that every normal variety is regular outside a subset of codimension at least 2, and a similar result is true for schemes. So, for example, every normal curve is regular.

== The normalization ==
Any reduced scheme X has a unique normalization: a normal scheme Y with an integral birational morphism Y → X. (For X a variety over a field, the morphism Y → X is finite, which is stronger than "integral".) The normalization of a scheme of dimension 1 is regular, and the normalization of a scheme of dimension 2 has only isolated singularities. Normalization is not usually used for resolution of singularities for schemes of higher dimension.

To define the normalization, first suppose that X is an irreducible reduced scheme X. Every affine open subset of X has the form Spec R with R an integral domain. Write X as a union of affine open subsets Spec A_{i}. Let B_{i} be the integral closure of A_{i} in its fraction field. Then the normalization of X is defined by gluing together the affine schemes Spec B_{i}.

If the initial scheme is not irreducible, the normalization is defined to be the disjoint union of the normalizations of the irreducible components.

=== Examples ===
==== Normalization of a cusp ====
Consider the affine curve

$C = \text{Spec} \left( \frac{ k[x,y] }{ y^2 - x^5 } \right)$

with the cusp singularity at the origin. Its normalization can be given by the map

$\text{Spec}(k[t]) \to C$

induced from the algebra map

$x \mapsto t^2, y \mapsto t^5$

==== Normalization of axes in affine plane ====
For example,

$X=\text{Spec}(\mathbb{C}[x,y]/(xy))$

is not an irreducible scheme since it has two components. Its normalization is given by the scheme morphism

$\text{Spec}(\mathbb{C}[x,y]/(x)\times\mathbb{C}[x,y]/(y)) \to \text{Spec}(\mathbb{C}[x,y]/(xy))$

induced from the two quotient maps

$\mathbb{C}[x,y]/(xy) \to \mathbb{C}[x,y]/(x,xy) = \mathbb{C}[x,y]/(x)$

$\mathbb{C}[x,y]/(xy) \to \mathbb{C}[x,y]/(y,xy) = \mathbb{C}[x,y]/(y)$

==== Normalization of reducible projective variety ====
Similarly, for homogeneous irreducible polynomials $f_1,\ldots,f_k$ in a UFD, the normalization of

$\text{Proj}\left( \frac{k[x_0,\ldots,x_n]}{(f_1\cdots f_k,g)} \right)$

is given by the morphism

$\text{Proj}\left(\prod \frac{k[x_0\ldots, x_n]}{(f_i,g)} \right) \to \text{Proj}\left( \frac{k[x_0,\ldots,x_n]}{(f_1\cdots f_k,g)} \right)$

== See also ==
- Noether normalization lemma
- Resolution of singularities
