= Gaetano Scorza =

Italian mathematician (1876–1939)

Bernardino Gaetano Scorza
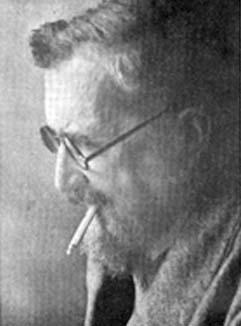
- Born: 29 September 1876; Morano Calabro
- Died: 6 August 1939 (aged 62); Rome
- Known for: Scorza varieties
- Scientific career
- Fields: algebraic geometry

Bernardino Gaetano Scorza (29 September 1876, in Morano Calabro – 6 August 1939, in Rome) was an Italian mathematician working in algebraic geometry, whose work inspired the theory of Scorza varieties.

== Publications ==
- Scorza, Gaetano (1960), Opere scelte. Vol. I. (1899–1915), Pubblicate a cura dell'Unione Matematica Italiana e col contributo del Consiglio Nazionale delle Ricerche, Rome: Edizioni cremonese, MR 0111670
- Scorza, Gaetano (1961), Opere Scelte. Vol. II. (1915–1919), Pubblicate a cura dell'Unione Matematica Italiana e col contributo del Consiglio Nazionale delle Ricerche, Rome: Edizioni cremonese, MR 0124997
- Scorza, Gaetano (1962), Opere scelte. Vol. III: (1920–1939), Pubblicate a cura dell'Unione Matematica Italiana e col contributo del Consiglio Nazionale delle Ricerche, Rome: Edizioni cremonese, MR 0189973
