= Twisted cubic =

Algebraic curve in projective 3-space

In mathematics, a twisted cubic is a smooth, rational curve C of degree three in projective 3-space P^{3}. It is a fundamental example of a skew curve. It is essentially unique, up to projective transformation (the twisted cubic, therefore). In algebraic geometry, the twisted cubic is a simple example of a projective variety that is not linear or a hypersurface, in fact not a complete intersection. It is the three-dimensional case of the rational normal curve, and is the image of a Veronese map of degree three on the projective line.

== Definition ==
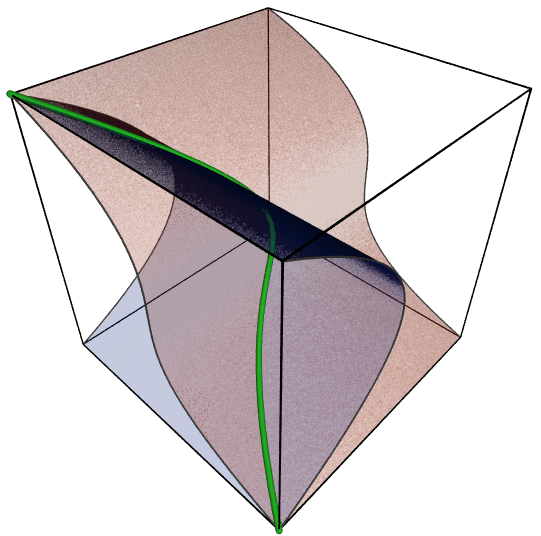

The twisted cubic is most easily given parametrically as the image of the map

$$\nu:\mathbf{P}^1\to\mathbf{P}^3$$

which assigns to the homogeneous coordinate $[S:T]$ the value

$$\nu:[S:T] \mapsto [S^3:S^2T:ST^2:T^3].$$

In one coordinate patch of projective space, the map is simply the moment curve

$$\nu:x \mapsto (x,x^2,x^3)$$

That is, it is the closure by a single point at infinity of the affine curve $(x,x^2,x^3)$.

The twisted cubic is a projective variety, defined as the intersection of three quadrics. In homogeneous coordinates $[X:Y:Z:W]$ on P^{3}, the twisted cubic is the closed subscheme defined by the vanishing of the three homogeneous polynomials

$$F_0 = XZ - Y^2$$
$$F_1 = YW - Z^2$$
$$F_2 = XW - YZ.$$

It may be checked that these three quadratic forms vanish identically when using the explicit parameterization above; that is, substitute x^{3} for X, and so on.

More strongly, the homogeneous ideal of the twisted cubic C is generated by these three homogeneous polynomials of degree 2.

== Properties ==
The twisted cubic has the following properties:

- It is the set-theoretic complete intersection of $XZ - Y^2$ and $Z(YW-Z^2)-W(XW-YZ)$, but not a scheme-theoretic or ideal-theoretic complete intersection; meaning to say that the ideal of the variety cannot be generated by only 2 polynomials; a minimum of 3 are needed. (An attempt to use only two polynomials make the resulting ideal not radical, since $(YW-Z^2)^2$ is in it, but $YW-Z^2$ is not).
- Any four points on C span P^{3}.
- Given six points in P^{3} with no four coplanar, there is a unique twisted cubic passing through them.
- The union of the tangent and secant lines (the secant variety) of a twisted cubic C fill up P^{3} and the lines are pairwise disjoint, except at points of the curve itself. In fact, the union of the tangent and secant lines of any non-planar smooth algebraic curve is three-dimensional. Further, any smooth algebraic variety with the property that every length four subscheme spans P^{3} has the property that the tangent and secant lines are pairwise disjoint, except at points of the variety itself.
- The projection of C onto a plane from a point on a tangent line of C yields a cuspidal cubic.
- The projection from a point on a secant line of C yields a nodal cubic.
- The projection from a point on C yields a conic section.
