= Rational normal scroll =

Surface in algebraic geometry

In mathematics, a rational normal scroll is a ruled surface of degree n in projective space of dimension n + 1. Here "rational" means birational to projective space, "scroll" is an old term for ruled surface, and "normal" refers to projective normality (not normal schemes).

A non-degenerate irreducible surface of degree m – 1 in P^{m} is either a rational normal scroll or the Veronese surface.

== Construction ==
In projective space of dimension m + n + 1 choose two complementary linear subspaces of dimensions m > 0 and n > 0. Choose rational normal curves in these two linear subspaces, and choose an isomorphism φ between them. Then the rational normal surface consists of all lines joining the points x and φ(x). In the degenerate case when one of m or n is 0, the rational normal scroll becomes a cone over a rational normal curve. If m < n then the rational normal curve of degree m is uniquely determined by the rational normal scroll and is called the directrix of the scroll.
