= Scorza variety =

In algebraic geometry, a k-Scorza variety is a smooth projective variety, of maximal dimension among those whose k–1 secant varieties are not the whole of projective space. Scorza varieties were introduced and classified by Zak (1993), who named them after Gaetano Scorza. The special case of 2-Scorza varieties are sometimes called Severi varieties, after Francesco Severi.

== Classification ==
Zak showed that k-Scorza varieties are the projective varieties of the rank 1 matrices of rank k simple Jordan algebras.

== Severi varieties ==
The Severi varieties are the non-singular varieties of dimension n (even) in P^{N} that can be isomorphically projected to a hyperplane and satisfy N=3n/2+2.

- Severi showed in 1901 that the only Severi variety with n=2 is the Veronese surface in P^{5}.
- The only Severi variety with n=4 is the Segre embedding of P^{2}×P^{2} into P^{8}, found by Scorza in 1908.
- The only Severi variety with n=8 is the 8-dimensional Grassmannian G(1,5) of lines in P^{5} embedded into P^{14}, found by John Greenlees Semple in 1931.
- The only Severi variety with n=16 is a 16-dimensional variety E_{6}/Spin(10)U(1) in P^{26} found by Robert Lazarsfeld in 1981.

These 4 Severi varieties can be constructed in a uniform way, as orbits of groups acting on the complexifications of the 3 by 3 hermitian matrices over the four real (possibly non-associative) division algebras of dimensions 2^{k} = 1, 2, 4, 8. These representations have complex dimensions 3(2^{k}+1) = 6, 9, 15, and 27, giving varieties of dimension 2^{k+1} = 2, 4, 8, 16 in projective spaces of dimensions 3(2^{k})+2 = 5, 8, 14, and 26.

Zak proved that the only Severi varieties are the 4 listed above, of dimensions 2, 4, 8, 16.
