= Veronese surface =

Rational surface in 5-dimensional projective space

In mathematics, the Veronese surface is an algebraic surface in five-dimensional projective space, and is realized by the Veronese embedding, the embedding of the projective plane given by the complete linear system of conics. It is named after Giuseppe Veronese (1854–1917). Its generalization to higher dimension is known as the Veronese variety.

The surface admits an embedding in the four-dimensional projective space defined by the projection from a general point in the five-dimensional space. Its general projection to three-dimensional projective space is called a Steiner surface.

== Definition ==
The Veronese surface is the image of the mapping

$$\nu:\mathbb{P}^2\to \mathbb{P}^5$$

given by

$$\nu: [x:y:z] \mapsto [x^2:y^2:z^2:yz:xz:xy]$$

where $[x:\cdots]$ denotes homogeneous coordinates. The map $\nu$ is known as the Veronese embedding.

== Motivation ==
The Veronese surface arises naturally in the study of conics. A conic is a degree 2 plane curve, thus defined by an equation:

$$Ax^2 + Bxy + Cy^2 +Dxz + Eyz + Fz^2 = 0.$$

The pairing between coefficients $(A, B, C, D, E, F)$ and variables $(x,y,z)$ is linear in coefficients and quadratic in the variables; the Veronese map makes it linear in the coefficients and linear in the monomials. Thus for a fixed point $[x:y:z],$ the condition that a conic contains the point is a linear equation in the coefficients, which formalizes the statement that "passing through a point imposes a linear condition on conics".

== Veronese map ==
The Veronese map or Veronese variety generalizes this idea to mappings of general degree d in n+1 variables. That is, the Veronese map of degree d is the map

$$\nu_d\colon \mathbb{P}^n \to \mathbb{P}^m$$

with m given by the multiset coefficient, or more familiarly the binomial coefficient, as:

$$m= \left(\!\!{n + 1 \choose d}\!\!\right) - 1 = {n+d \choose d} - 1.$$

The map sends $[x_0:\ldots:x_n]$ to all possible monomials of total degree d (of which there are $m+1$); we have $n+1$ since there are $n+1$ variables $x_0, \ldots, x_n$ to choose from; and we subtract $1$ since the projective space $\mathbb{P}^m$ has $m+1$ coordinates. The second equality shows that for fixed source dimension n, the target dimension is a polynomial in d of degree n and leading coefficient $1/n!.$

For low degree, $d=0$ is the trivial constant map to $\mathbf{P}^0,$ and $d=1$ is the identity map on $\mathbf{P}^n,$ so d is generally taken to be 2 or more.

One may define the Veronese map in a coordinate-free way, as

$$\nu_d: \mathbb{P}(V) \ni [v] \mapsto [v^d] \in \mathbb{P}(\operatorname{Sym}^d V)$$

where V is any vector space of finite dimension, and $\operatorname{Sym}^d V$ are its symmetric powers of degree d. This is homogeneous of degree d under scalar multiplication on V, and therefore passes to a mapping on the underlying projective spaces.

If the vector space V is defined over a field K which does not have characteristic zero, then the definition must be altered to be understood as a mapping to the dual space of polynomials on V. This is because for fields with finite characteristic p, the pth powers of elements of V are not rational normal curves, but are of course a line. (See, for example, additive polynomial for a treatment of polynomials over a field of finite characteristic.)

=== Rational normal curve ===
For $n=1,$ the Veronese variety is known as the rational normal curve, of which the lower-degree examples are familiar.

- For $n=1, d=1$ the Veronese map is simply the identity map on the projective line.
- For $n=1, d=2,$ the Veronese variety is the standard parabola $[x^2:xy:y^2],$ in affine coordinates $(x,x^2).$
- For $n=1, d=3,$ the Veronese variety is the twisted cubic, $[x^3:x^2y:xy^2:y^3],$ in affine coordinates $(x,x^2,x^3).$

== Biregular ==
The image of a variety under the Veronese map is again a variety, rather than simply a constructible set; furthermore, these are isomorphic in the sense that the inverse map exists and is regular – the Veronese map is biregular. More precisely, the images of open sets in the Zariski topology are again open.

== See also ==
- The Veronese surface is the only Severi variety of dimension 2
