= Algebraic curve =

Curve defined as zeros of polynomials

The Tschirnhausen cubic is an algebraic curve of degree three.

In mathematics, an affine algebraic plane curve is the zero set of a polynomial in two variables. A projective algebraic plane curve is the zero set in a projective plane of a homogeneous polynomial in three variables. An affine algebraic plane curve can be completed in a projective algebraic plane curve by homogenizing its defining polynomial. Conversely, a projective algebraic plane curve of homogeneous equation h(x, y, t) = 0 can be restricted to the affine algebraic plane curve of equation h(x, y, 1) = 0. These two operations are each inverse to the other; therefore, the phrase algebraic plane curve is often used without specifying explicitly whether it is the affine or the projective case that is considered.

If the defining polynomial of a plane algebraic curve is irreducible, then one has an irreducible plane algebraic curve. Otherwise, the algebraic curve is the union of one or several irreducible curves, called its components, that are defined by the irreducible factors.

More generally, an algebraic curve is an algebraic variety of dimension one. In some contexts, an algebraic set of dimension one is also called an algebraic curve, but this will not be the case in this article. Equivalently, an algebraic curve is an algebraic variety that is birationally equivalent to an irreducible algebraic plane curve. If the curve is contained in an affine space or a projective space, one can take a projection for such a birational equivalence.

These birational equivalences reduce most of the study of algebraic curves to the study of algebraic plane curves. However, some properties are not kept under birational equivalence and must be studied on non-plane curves. This is, in particular, the case for the degree and smoothness. For example, there exist smooth curves of genus 0 and degree greater than two, but any plane projection of such curves has singular points (see Genus–degree formula).

A non-plane curve is often called a space curve or a skew curve.

== In Euclidean geometry ==
An algebraic curve in the Euclidean plane is the set of the points whose coordinates are the solutions of a bivariate polynomial equation p(x, y) = 0. This equation is often called the implicit equation of the curve, in contrast to the curves that are the graph of a function defining explicitly y as a function of x.

With a curve given by such an implicit equation, the first problems are to determine the shape of the curve and to draw it. These problems are not as easy to solve as in the case of the graph of a function, for which y may easily be computed for various values of x. The fact that the defining equation is a polynomial implies that the curve has some structural properties that may help in solving these problems.

Every algebraic curve may be uniquely decomposed into a finite number of smooth monotone arcs, called branches, sometimes connected by some points sometimes called "remarkable points", and possibly a finite number of isolated points called acnodes. A smooth monotone arc is the graph of a smooth function which is defined and monotone on an open interval of the x-axis. In each direction, an arc is either unbounded (usually called an infinite arc) or has an endpoint which is either a singular point (this will be defined below) or a point with a tangent parallel to one of the coordinate axes.

For example, for the Tschirnhausen cubic, there are two infinite arcs having the origin (0,0) as of endpoint. This point is the only singular point of the curve. There are also two arcs having this singular point as one endpoint and having a second endpoint with a horizontal tangent. Finally, there are two other arcs each having one of these points with horizontal tangent as the first endpoint and having the unique point with vertical tangent as the second endpoint. In contrast, the sinusoid is certainly not an algebraic curve, having an infinite number of monotone arcs.

To draw an algebraic curve, it is important to know the remarkable points and their tangents, the infinite branches and their asymptotes (if any) and the way in which the arcs connect them. It is also useful to consider the inflection points as remarkable points. When all this information is drawn on a sheet of paper, the shape of the curve usually appears rather clearly. If not, it suffices to add a few other points and their tangents to get a good description of the curve.

The methods for computing the remarkable points and their tangents are described below in the section Remarkable points of a plane curve.

== Plane projective curves ==
It is often desirable to consider curves in the projective space. An algebraic curve in the projective plane or plane projective curve is the set of the points in a projective plane whose projective coordinates are zeros of a homogeneous polynomial in three variables P(x, y, z).

Every affine algebraic curve of equation p(x, y) = 0 may be completed into the projective curve of equation ^{h}p(x, y, z) = 0, where
$$^hp(x,y,z)=z^{\deg(p)}p\left(\frac{x}{z},\frac{y}{z}\right)$$
is the result of the homogenization of p. Conversely, if P(x, y, z) = 0 is the homogeneous equation of a projective curve, then P(x, y, 1) = 0 is the equation of an affine curve, which consists of the points of the projective curve whose third projective coordinate is not zero. These two operations are reciprocal one to the other, as
$$^hp(x,y,1)=p(x,y)$$
and, if p is defined by p(x, y) = P(x, y, 1), then
$$^hp(x,y,z)=P(x,y,z)$$
as soon as the homogeneous polynomial P is not divisible by z.

For example, the projective curve of equation
$$x^2 + y^2 - z^2$$
is the projective completion of the unit circle of equation
$$x^2 + y^2 - 1 = 0.$$

This implies that an affine curve and its projective completion are the same curves, or, more precisely that the affine curve is a part of the projective curve that is large enough to well define the "complete" curve. This point of view is commonly expressed by calling "points at infinity" of the affine curve the points (in finite number) of the projective completion that do not belong to the affine part.

Projective curves are frequently studied for themselves. They are also useful for the study of affine curves. For example, if p(x, y) is the polynomial defining an affine curve, beside the partial derivatives p'_{x} and p'_{y}, it is useful to consider the derivative at infinity
$$p'_\infty(x,y)={^hp'_z(x,y,1)}.$$

For example, the equation of the tangent of the affine curve of equation p(x, y) = 0 at a point (a, b) is
$$xp'_x(a,b)+yp'_y(a,b)+p'_\infty(a,b)=0.$$

== Remarkable points of a plane curve ==
In this section, we consider a plane algebraic curve defined by a bivariate polynomial p(x, y) and its projective completion, defined by the homogenization $P(x,y,z)= {}^hp(x,y,z)$ of p.

=== Intersection with a line ===
Knowing the points of intersection of a curve with a given line is frequently useful. The intersection with the axes of coordinates and the asymptotes are useful to draw the curve. Intersecting with a line parallel to the axes allows one to find at least a point in each branch of the curve. If an efficient root-finding algorithm is available, this allows to draw the curve by plotting the intersection point with all the lines parallel to the y-axis and passing through each pixel on the x-axis.

If the polynomial defining the curve has a degree d, any line cuts the curve in at most d points. Bézout's theorem asserts that this number is exactly d, if the points are searched in the projective plane over an algebraically closed field (for example the complex numbers), and counted with their multiplicity. The method of computation that follows proves again this theorem, in this simple case.

To compute the intersection of the curve defined by the polynomial p with the line of equation ax+by+c = 0, one solves the equation of the line for x (or for y if a = 0). Substituting the result in p, one gets a univariate equation q(y) = 0 (or q(x) = 0, if the equation of the line has been solved in y), each of whose roots is one coordinate of an intersection point. The other coordinate is deduced from the equation of the line. The multiplicity of an intersection point is the multiplicity of the corresponding root. There is an intersection point at infinity if the degree of q is lower than the degree of p; the multiplicity of such an intersection point at infinity is the difference of the degrees of p and q.

=== Tangent at a point ===
The tangent at a point (a, b) of the curve is the line of equation $(x-a)p'_x(a,b)+(y-b)p'_y(a,b)=0$, like for every differentiable curve defined by an implicit equation. In the case of polynomials, another formula for the tangent has a simpler constant term and is more symmetric:

$$xp'_x(a,b)+yp'_y(a,b)+p'_\infty(a,b)=0,$$

where $p'_\infty(x,y)=P'_z(x,y,1)$ is the derivative at infinity. The equivalence of the two equations results from Euler's homogeneous function theorem applied to P.

If $p'_x(a,b)=p'_y(a,b)=0,$ the tangent is not defined and the point is a singular point.

This extends immediately to the projective case: The equation of the tangent of at the point of projective coordinates (a:b:c) of the projective curve of equation P(x, y, z) = 0 is

$$xP'_x(a,b,c)+yP'_y(a,b,c)+zP'_z(a,b,c)=0,$$

and the points of the curves that are singular are the points such that

$$P'_x(a,b,c)=P'_y(a,b,c)=P'_z(a,b,c)=0.$$

(The condition P(a, b, c) = 0 is implied by these conditions, by Euler's homogeneous function theorem.)

=== Asymptotes ===
Every infinite branch of an algebraic curve corresponds to a point at infinity on the curve, that is a point of the projective completion of the curve that does not belong to its affine part. The corresponding asymptote is the tangent of the curve at that point. The general formula for a tangent to a projective curve may apply, but it is worth to make it explicit in this case.

Let $p=p_d+\cdots+p_0$ be the decomposition of the polynomial defining the curve into its homogeneous parts, where p_{i} is the sum of the monomials of p of degree i. It follows that
$$P={^hp}=p_d+zp_{d-1}+\cdots+z^dp_0$$
and
$$P'_z(a,b,0) =p_{d-1}(a,b).$$

A point at infinity of the curve is a zero of p of the form (a, b, 0). Equivalently, (a, b) is a zero of p_{d}. The fundamental theorem of algebra implies that, over an algebraically closed field (typically, the field of complex numbers), p_{d} factors into a product of linear factors. Each factor defines a point at infinity on the curve: if bx − ay is such a factor, then it defines the point at infinity (a, b, 0). Over the reals, p_{d} factors into linear and quadratic factors. The irreducible quadratic factors define non-real points at infinity, and the real points are given by the linear factors. If (a, b, 0) is a point at infinity of the curve, one says that (a, b) is an asymptotic direction. Setting q = p_{d} the equation of the corresponding asymptote is
$$xq'_x(a,b)+yq'_y(a,b)+p_{d-1}(a,b)=0.$$

If $q'_x(a,b)=q'_y(a,b)=0$ and $p_{d-1}(a,b)\neq 0,$ the asymptote is the line at infinity, and, in the real case, the curve has a branch that looks like a parabola. In this case one says that the curve has a parabolic branch. If
$$q'_x(a,b)=q'_y(a,b)=p_{d-1}(a,b)=0,$$
the curve has a singular point at infinity and may have several asymptotes. They may be computed by the method of computing the tangent cone of a singular point.

=== Singular points ===
The singular points of a curve of degree d defined by a polynomial p(x,y) of degree d are the solutions of the system of equations:
$$p'_x(x,y)=p'_y(x,y)=p(x,y)=0.$$
In characteristic zero, this system is equivalent to
$$p'_x(x,y)=p'_y(x,y)=p'_\infty(x,y)=0,$$
where, with the notation of the preceding section, $p'_\infty(x,y)=P'_z(x,y,1).$ The systems are equivalent because of Euler's homogeneous function theorem. The latter system has the advantage of having its third polynomial of degree d-1 instead of d.

Similarly, for a projective curve defined by a homogeneous polynomial P(x,y,z) of degree d, the singular points have the solutions of the system
$$P'_x(x,y,z)=P'_y(x,y,z)=P'_z(x,y,z)=0$$
as homogeneous coordinates. (In positive characteristic, the equation $P(x,y,z)$ has to be added to the system.)

This implies that the number of singular points is finite as long as p(x,y) or P(x,y,z) is square free. Bézout's theorem implies thus that the number of singular points is at most (d − 1)^{2}, but this bound is not sharp because the system of equations is overdetermined. If reducible polynomials are allowed, the sharp bound is d(d − 1)/2, this value is reached when the polynomial factors in linear factors, that is if the curve is the union of d lines. For irreducible curves and polynomials, the number of singular points is at most (d − 1)(d − 2)/2, because of the formula expressing the genus in term of the singularities (see below). The maximum is reached by the curves of genus zero whose all singularities have multiplicity two and distinct tangents (see below).

The equation of the tangents at a singular point is given by the nonzero homogeneous part of the lowest degree in the Taylor series of the polynomial at the singular point. When one changes the coordinates to put the singular point at the origin, the equation of the tangents at the singular point is thus the nonzero homogeneous part of the lowest degree of the polynomial, and the multiplicity of the singular point is the degree of this homogeneous part.

== Analytic structure ==
The study of the analytic structure of an algebraic curve in the neighborhood of a singular point provides accurate information of the topology of singularities. In fact, near a singular point, a real algebraic curve is the union of a finite number of branches that intersect only at the singular point and look either as a cusp or as a smooth curve.

Near a regular point, one of the coordinates of the curve may be expressed as an analytic function of the other coordinate. This is a corollary of the analytic implicit function theorem, and implies that the curve is smooth near the point. Near a singular point, the situation is more complicated and involves Puiseux series, which provide analytic parametric equations of the branches.

For describing a singularity, it is worth to translate the curve for having the singularity at the origin. This consists of a change of variable of the form $X=x-a, Y=y-b,$ where $a, b$ are the coordinates of the singular point. In the following, the singular point under consideration is always supposed to be at the origin.

The equation of an algebraic curve is $f(x,y)=0,$ where f is a polynomial in x and y. This polynomial may be considered as a polynomial in y, with coefficients in the algebraically closed field of the Puiseux series in x. Thus f may be factored in factors of the form $y-P(x),$ where P is a Puiseux series. These factors are all different if f is an irreducible polynomial, because this implies that f is square-free, a property which is independent of the field of coefficients.

The Puiseux series that occur here have the form
$$P(x)=\sum_{n=n_0}^\infty a_nx^{n/d},$$
where d is a positive integer, and $n_0$ is an integer that may also be supposed to be positive, because we consider only the branches of the curve that pass through the origin. Without loss of generality, we may suppose that d is coprime with the greatest common divisor of the n such that $a_n \ne 0$ (otherwise, one could choose a smaller common denominator for the exponents).

Let $\omega_d$ be a primitive dth root of unity. If the above Puiseux series occurs in the factorization of $f(x,y)=0$, then the d series
$$P_i(x)=\sum_{n=n_0}^\infty a_n\omega_d^i x^{n/d}$$
occur also in the factorization (a consequence of Galois theory). These d series are said conjugate, and are considered as a single branch of the curve, of ramification index d.

In the case of a real curve, that is a curve defined by a polynomial with real coefficients, three cases may occur. If none $P_i(x)$ has real coefficients, then one has a non-real branch. If some $P_i(x)$ has real coefficients, then one may choose it as $P_0(x)$. If d is odd, then every real value of x provides a real value of $P_0(x)$, and one has a real branch that looks regular, although it is singular if d > 1. If d is even, then $P_0(x)$ and $P_{d/2}(x)$ have real values, but only for x ≥ 0. In this case, the real branch looks as a cusp (or is a cusp, depending on the definition of a cusp that is used).

For example, the ordinary cusp has only one branch. If it is defined by the equation $y^2-x^3=0,$ then the factorization is $(y-x^{3/2})(y+x^{3/2});$ the ramification index is 2, and the two factors are real and define each a half branch. If the cusp is rotated, it equation becomes $y^3-x^2=0,$ and the factorization is $(y-x^{2/3})(y-j^2x^{2/3})(y-(j^2)^2x^{2/3}),$ with $j=(1+\sqrt{-3})/2$ (the coefficient $(j^2)^2$ has not been simplified to j for showing how the above definition of $P_i(x)$ is specialized). Here the ramification index is 3, and only one factor is real; this shows that, in the first case, the two factors must be considered as defining the same branch.

== Non-plane algebraic curves ==
An algebraic curve is an algebraic variety of dimension one. This implies that an affine curve in an affine space of dimension n is defined by, at least, n − 1 polynomials in n variables. To define a curve, these polynomials must generate a prime ideal of Krull dimension 1. This condition is not easy to test in practice. Therefore, the following way to represent non-plane curves may be preferred.

Let $f, g_0, g_3, \ldots, g_n$ be n polynomials in two variables x_{1} and x_{2} such that f is irreducible. The points in the affine space of dimension n such whose coordinates satisfy the equations and inequations

$$\begin{align}
&f(x_1,x_2)=0\\
&g_0(x_1,x_2)\neq 0\\
x_3&=\frac{g_3(x_1,x_2)}{g_0(x_1,x_2)}\\
& {}\ \vdots \\
x_n&=\frac{g_n(x_1,x_2)}{g_0(x_1,x_2)}
\end{align}$$

are all the points of an algebraic curve in which a finite number of points have been removed. This curve is defined by a system of generators of the ideal of the polynomials h such that it exists an integer k such $g_0^kh$ belongs to the ideal generated by $f, x_3g_0-g_3, \ldots, x_ng_0-g_n$. This representation is a birational equivalence between the curve and the plane curve defined by f. Every algebraic curve may be represented in this way. However, a linear change of variables may be needed in order to make almost always injective the projection on the two first variables. When a change of variables is needed, almost every change is convenient, as soon as it is defined over an infinite field.

This representation allows us to deduce easily any property of a non-plane algebraic curve, including its graphical representation, from the corresponding property of its plane projection.

For a curve defined by its implicit equations, above representation of the curve may easily deduced from a Gröbner basis for a block ordering such that the block of the smaller variables is (x_{1}, x_{2}). The polynomial f is the unique polynomial in the base that depends only of x_{1} and x_{2}. The fractions g_{i}/g_{0} are obtained by choosing, for i = 3, ..., n, a polynomial in the basis that is linear in x_{i} and depends only on x_{1}, x_{2} and x_{i}. If these choices are not possible, this means either that the equations define an algebraic set that is not a variety, or that the variety is not of dimension one, or that one must change of coordinates. The latter case occurs when f exists and is unique, and, for i = 3, ..., n, there exist polynomials whose leading monomial depends only on x_{1}, x_{2} and x_{i}.

== Algebraic function fields ==
The study of algebraic curves can be reduced to the study of irreducible algebraic curves: those curves that cannot be written as the union of two smaller curves. Up to birational equivalence, the irreducible curves over a field F are categorically equivalent to algebraic function fields in one variable over F. Such an algebraic function field is a field extension K of F that contains an element x which is transcendental over F, and such that K is a finite algebraic extension of F(x), which is the field of rational functions in the indeterminate x over F.

For example, consider the field C of complex numbers, over which we may define the field C(x) of rational functions in C. If y^{2} = x^{3} − x − 1, then the field C(x, y) is an elliptic function field. The element x is not uniquely determined; the field can also be regarded, for instance, as an extension of C(y). The algebraic curve corresponding to the function field is simply the set of points (x, y) in C^{2} satisfying y^{2} = x^{3} − x − 1.

If the field F is not algebraically closed, the point of view of function fields is a little more general than that of considering the locus of points, since we include, for instance, "curves" with no points on them. For example, if the base field F is the field R of real numbers, then x^{2} + y^{2} = −1 defines an algebraic extension field of R(x), but the corresponding curve considered as a subset of R^{2} has no points. The equation x^{2} + y^{2} = −1 does define an irreducible algebraic curve over R in the scheme sense (an integral, separated one-dimensional schemes of finite type over R). In this sense, the one-to-one correspondence between irreducible algebraic curves over F (up to birational equivalence) and algebraic function fields in one variable over F holds in general.

Two curves can be birationally equivalent (i.e. have isomorphic function fields) without being isomorphic as curves. The situation becomes easier when dealing with nonsingular curves, i.e. those that lack any singularities. Two nonsingular projective curves over a field are isomorphic if and only if their function fields are isomorphic.

Tsen's theorem is about the function field of an algebraic curve over an algebraically closed field.

== Complex curves and real surfaces ==
A complex projective algebraic curve resides in n-dimensional complex projective space CP^{n}. This has complex dimension n, but topological dimension, as a real manifold, 2n, and is compact, connected, and orientable. An algebraic curve over C likewise has topological dimension two; in other words, it is a surface.

The topological genus of this surface, that is the number of handles or donut holes, is equal to the geometric genus of the algebraic curve that may be computed by algebraic means. In short, if one consider a plane projection of a nonsingular curve that has degree d and only ordinary singularities (singularities of multiplicity two with distinct tangents), then the genus is (d − 1)(d − 2)/2 − k, where k is the number of these singularities.

=== Compact Riemann surfaces ===
A Riemann surface is a connected complex analytic manifold of one complex dimension, which makes it a connected real manifold of two dimensions. It is compact if it is compact as a topological space.

There is a triple equivalence of categories between the category of smooth irreducible projective algebraic curves over C (with non-constant regular maps as morphisms), the category of compact Riemann surfaces (with non-constant holomorphic maps as morphisms), and the opposite of the category of algebraic function fields in one variable over C (with field homomorphisms that fix C as morphisms). This means that in studying these three subjects we are in a sense studying one and the same thing. It allows complex analytic methods to be used in algebraic geometry, and algebraic-geometric methods in complex analysis and field-theoretic methods to be used in both. This is characteristic of a much wider class of problems in algebraic geometry.

See also algebraic geometry and analytic geometry for a more general theory.

== Singularities ==
Using the intrinsic concept of tangent space, points P on an algebraic curve C are classified as smooth (synonymous: non-singular), or else singular. Given n − 1 homogeneous polynomials in n + 1 variables, we may find the Jacobian matrix as the (n − 1)×(n + 1) matrix of the partial derivatives. If the rank of this matrix is n − 1, then the polynomials define an algebraic curve (otherwise they define an algebraic variety of higher dimension). If the rank remains n − 1 when the Jacobian matrix is evaluated at a point P on the curve, then the point is a smooth or regular point; otherwise it is a singular point. In particular, if the curve is a plane projective algebraic curve, defined by a single homogeneous polynomial equation f(x,y,z) = 0, then the singular points are precisely the points P where the rank of the 1×(n + 1) matrix is zero, that is, where
$$\frac{ \partial f }{ \partial x }(P)=\frac{ \partial f }{ \partial y }(P)=\frac{ \partial f }{ \partial z }(P)=0.$$

Since f is a polynomial, this definition is purely algebraic and makes no assumption about the nature of the field F, which in particular need not be the real or complex numbers. It should, of course, be recalled that (0,0,0) is not a point of the curve and hence not a singular point.

Similarly, for an affine algebraic curve defined by a single polynomial equation f(x,y) = 0, then the singular points are precisely the points P of the curve where the rank of the 1×n Jacobian matrix is zero, that is, where

$$f(P)=\frac{ \partial f }{ \partial x }(P)=\frac{ \partial f }{ \partial y }(P)=0.$$

The singularities of a curve are not birational invariants. However, locating and classifying the singularities of a curve is one way of computing the genus, which is a birational invariant. For this to work, we should consider the curve projectively and require F to be algebraically closed, so that all the singularities which belong to the curve are considered.

=== Classification of singularities ===
x^{3} = y^{2}

Singular points include multiple points where the curve crosses over itself, and also various types of cusp, for example that shown by the curve with equation x^{3} = y^{2} at (0,0).

A curve C has at most a finite number of singular points. If it has none, it can be called smooth or non-singular. Commonly, this definition is understood over an algebraically closed field and for a curve C in a projective space (i.e., complete in the sense of algebraic geometry). For example, the plane curve of equation $y-x^3=0$ is considered as singular, as having a singular point (a cusp) at infinity.

In the remainder of this section, one considers a plane curve C defined as the zero set of a bivariate polynomial f(x, y). Some of the results, but not all, may be generalized to non-plane curves.

The singular points are classified by means of several invariants. The multiplicity m is defined as the maximum integer such that the derivatives of f to all orders up to m – 1 vanish (also the minimal intersection number between the curve and a straight line at P). Intuitively, a singular point has delta invariant δ if it concentrates δ ordinary double points at P. To make this precise, the blow up process produces so-called infinitely near points, and summing m(m − 1)/2 over the infinitely near points, where m is their multiplicity, produces δ. For an irreducible and reduced curve and a point P we can define δ algebraically as the length of $\widetilde{\mathcal{O}}_P / \mathcal{O}_P$ where $\mathcal{O}_P$ is the local ring at P and $\widetilde{\mathcal{O}}_P$ is its integral closure.

The Milnor number μ of a singularity is the degree of the mapping (grad f(x,y))/(|grad f(x,y)|) on the small sphere of radius ε, in the sense of the topological degree of a continuous mapping, where grad f is the (complex) gradient vector field of f. It is related to δ and r by the Milnor–Jung formula,

μ = 2δ − r + 1.

Here, the branching number r of P is the number of locally irreducible branches at P. For example, r = 1 at an ordinary cusp, and r = 2 at an ordinary double point. The multiplicity m is at least r, and that P is singular if and only if m is at least 2. Moreover, δ is at least m(m-1)/2.

Computing the delta invariants of all of the singularities allows the genus g of the curve to be determined; if d is the degree, then

$$g = \frac{1}{2}(d-1)(d-2) - \sum_P \delta_P,$$

where the sum is taken over all singular points P of the complex projective plane curve. It is called the genus formula.

Assign the invariants [m, δ, r] to a singularity, where m is the multiplicity, δ is the delta-invariant, and r is the branching number. Then an ordinary cusp is a point with invariants [2,1,1] and an ordinary double point is a point with invariants [2,1,2], and an ordinary m-multiple point is a point with invariants [m, m(m − 1)/2, m].

== Examples of curves ==
=== Rational curves ===
A rational curve, also called a unicursal curve, is any curve which is birationally equivalent to a line, which we may take to be a projective line; accordingly, we may identify the function field of the curve with the field of rational functions in one indeterminate F(x). If F is algebraically closed, this is equivalent to a curve of genus zero; however, the field of all real algebraic functions defined on the real algebraic variety x^{2} + y^{2} = −1 is a field of genus zero which is not a rational function field.

Concretely, a rational curve embedded in an affine space of dimension n over F can be parameterized (except for isolated exceptional points) by means of n rational functions of a single parameter t; by reducing these rational functions to the same denominator, the n+1 resulting polynomials define a polynomial parametrization of the projective completion of the curve in the projective space. An example is the rational normal curve, where all these polynomials are monomials.

Any conic section defined over F with a rational point in F is a rational curve. It can be parameterized by drawing a line with slope t through the rational point, and an intersection with the plane quadratic curve; this gives a polynomial with F-rational coefficients and one F-rational root, hence the other root is F-rational (i.e., belongs to F) also.

x^{2} + xy + y^{2} = 1

For example, consider the ellipse x^{2} + xy + y^{2} = 1, where (−1, 0) is a rational point. Drawing a line with slope t from (−1,0), y = t(x + 1), substituting it in the equation of the ellipse, factoring, and solving for x, we obtain

$$x = \frac{1-t^2}{1+t+t^2}.$$

Then the equation for y is

$$y=t(x+1)=\frac{t(t+2)}{1+t+t^2}\,,$$

which defines a rational parameterization of the ellipse and hence shows the ellipse is a rational curve. All points of the ellipse are given, except for (−1,1), which corresponds to t = ∞; the entire curve is parameterized therefore by the real projective line.

Such a rational parameterization may be considered in the projective space by equating the first projective coordinates to the numerators of the parameterization and the last one to the common denominator. As the parameter is defined in a projective line, the polynomials in the parameter should be homogenized. For example, the projective parameterization of the above ellipse is

$$X=U^2-T^2,\quad Y=T\,(T+2\,U),\quad Z=T^2+TU+U^2.$$

Eliminating T and U between these equations we get again the projective equation of the ellipse
$$X^2+X\,Y+Y^2=Z^2,$$
which may be easily obtained directly by homogenizing the above equation.

Many of the curves on Wikipedia's list of curves are rational and hence have similar rational parameterizations.

=== Rational plane curves ===
Rational plane curves are rational curves embedded into $\mathbb{P}^2$. Given generic sections $s_1,s_2,s_3 \in \Gamma(\mathbb{P}^1, \mathcal{O}(d))$ of degree $d$ homogeneous polynomials in two coordinates, $x,y$, there is a map
$$s:\mathbb{P}^1 \to \mathbb{P}^2$$
given by
$$s([x:y]) = [s_1([x:y]):s_2([x:y]):s_3([x:y])]$$
defining a rational plane curve of degree $d$. There is an associated moduli space $\mathcal{M} = \overline{\mathcal{M}}_{0,0}(\mathbb{P}^2, d\cdot [H])$ (where $[H]$ is the hyperplane class) parametrizing all such stable curves. A dimension count can be made to determine the moduli spaces dimension: There are $d+1$ parameters in $\Gamma(\mathbb{P}^1, \mathcal{O}(d))$ giving $3d+3$ parameters total for each of the sections. Then, since they are considered up to a projective quotient in $\mathbb{P}^2$ there is $1$ less parameter in $\mathcal{M}$. Furthermore, there is a three dimensional group of automorphisms of $\mathbb{P}^1$, hence $\mathcal{M}$ has dimension $3d + 3 - 1 - 3 = 3d - 1$. This moduli space can be used to count the number $N_d$ of degree $d$ rational plane curves intersecting $3d-1$ points using Gromov–Witten theory. It is given by the recursive relation
$$N_d = \sum_{d_A + d_B = d} N_{d_A} N_{d_B} d_A^2 d_B\left( d_B\binom{3d-4}{3d_A-2} - d_A\binom{3d-4}{3d_A-1} \right)$$
where $N_1 = N_2 = 1$.

=== Elliptic curves ===
An elliptic curve may be defined as any curve of genus one with a rational point: a common model is a nonsingular cubic curve, which suffices to model any genus one curve. In this model the distinguished point is commonly taken to be an inflection point at infinity; this amounts to requiring that the curve can be written in Tate-Weierstrass form, which in its projective version is
$$y^2z + a_1 xyz + a_3 yz^2 = x^3 + a_2 x^2z + a_4 xz^2 + a_6 z^3.$$

If the characteristic of the field is different from 2 and 3, then a linear change of coordinates allows putting $a_1=a_2=a_3=0,$ which gives the classical Weierstrass form
$$y^2 = x^3 + p x + q.$$

Elliptic curves carry the structure of an abelian group with the distinguished point as the identity of the group law. In a plane cubic model three points sum to zero in the group if and only if they are collinear. For an elliptic curve defined over the complex numbers the group is isomorphic to the additive group of the complex plane modulo the period lattice of the corresponding elliptic functions.

The intersection of two quadric surfaces is, in general, a nonsingular curve of genus one and degree four, and thus an elliptic curve, if it has a rational point. In special cases, the intersection either may be a rational singular quartic or is decomposed in curves of smaller degrees which are not always distinct (either a cubic curve and a line, or two conics, or a conic and two lines, or four lines).

=== Curves of genus greater than one ===
Curves of genus greater than one differ markedly from both rational and elliptic curves. Such curves defined over the rational numbers, by Faltings' theorem, can have only a finite number of rational points, and they may be viewed as having a hyperbolic geometry structure. Examples are the hyperelliptic curves, the Klein quartic curve, and the Fermat curve x^{n} + y^{n} = z^{n} when n is greater than three. Also projective plane curves in $\mathbb{P}^2$ and curves in $\mathbb{P}^1\times\mathbb{P}^1$ provide many useful examples.

==== Projective plane curves ====
Plane curves $C \subset \mathbb{P}^2$ of degree $k$, which can be constructed as the vanishing locus of a generic section $s \in \Gamma(\mathbb{P}^2, \mathcal{O}(k))$, have genus
$$\frac{(k-1)(k-2)}{2}$$
which can be computed using coherent sheaf cohomology. Here's a brief summary of the curves' genera relative to their degree

degree	1	2	3	4	5	6	7
genus	0	0	1	3	6	10	15

For example, the curve $x^4 + y^4 + z^4$ defines a curve of genus $3$ which is smooth since the differentials $4x^3, 4y^3, 4z^3$ have no common zeros with the curve. A non-example of a generic section is the curve $x(x^2 + y^2 + z^2)$ which, by Bezout's theorem, should intersect at most $2$ points; it is the union of two rational curves $C_1 \cup C_2$ intersecting at two points. Note $C_1$ is given by the vanishing locus of $x$ and $C_2$ is given by the vanishing locus of $x^2 + y^2 + z^2$. These can be found explicitly: a point lies in both if $x = 0$. So the two solutions are the points $[0:y:z]$ such that $y^2 + z^2 = 0$, which are $[0:1:-\sqrt{-1}]$ and $[0: 1: \sqrt{-1}]$.

==== Curves in product of projective lines ====
Curve $C \subset \mathbb{P}^1\times\mathbb{P}^1$ given by the vanishing locus of $s \in \Gamma(\mathbb{P}^1\times\mathbb{P}^1, \mathcal{O}(a,b))$, for $a,b \geq 2$, give curves of genus
$$ab - a -b + 1$$
which can be checked using coherent sheaf cohomology. If $a = 2$, then they define curves of genus $2b -2 -b + 1 = b-1$, hence a curve of any genus can be constructed as a curve in $\mathbb{P}^1\times\mathbb{P}^1$. Their genera can be summarized in the table

bidegree	$(2,2)$	$(2,3)$	$(2,4)$	$(2,5)$
genus	1	2	3	4

and for $a = 3$, this is

bidegree	$(3,2)$	$(3,3)$	$(3,4)$	$(3,5)$
genus	2	4	6	8

== See also ==
=== Classical algebraic geometry ===
- Acnode
- Bézout's theorem
- Cramer's theorem (algebraic curves)
- Crunode
- Curve
- Curve sketching
- Jacobian variety
- Klein quartic
- List of curves
- Hilbert's sixteenth problem
- Cubic plane curve
- Hyperelliptic curve

=== Modern algebraic geometry ===
- Birational geometry
- Conic section
- Elliptic curve
- Fractional ideal
- Function field of an algebraic variety
- Function field (scheme theory)
- Genus (mathematics)
- Polynomial lemniscate
- Quartic plane curve
- Rational normal curve
- Riemann–Roch theorem for algebraic curves
- Weber's theorem (Algebraic curves)

=== Geometry of Riemann surfaces ===
- Riemann–Hurwitz formula
- Riemann–Roch theorem for Riemann surfaces
- Riemann surface
