= Dimension of a scheme =

In algebraic geometry, the dimension of a scheme is a generalization of the dimension of an algebraic variety. Scheme theory emphasizes the relative point of view and, accordingly, the relative dimension of a morphism of schemes is also important.

== Definition ==
By definition, the dimension of a scheme X is the dimension of the underlying topological space: the supremum of the lengths ℓ of chains of irreducible closed subsets:

$\emptyset \ne V_0 \subsetneq V_1 \subsetneq \cdots \subsetneq V_\ell \subset X.$

In particular, if $X = \operatorname{Spec} A$ is an affine scheme, then such chains correspond to chains of prime ideals (inclusion reversed), so the dimension of X is precisely the Krull dimension of A.

If Y is an irreducible closed subset of a scheme X, then the codimension of Y in X is the supremum of the lengths ℓ of chains of irreducible closed subsets:

$Y = V_0 \subsetneq V_1 \subsetneq \cdots \subsetneq V_\ell \subset X.$

An irreducible subset of X is an irreducible component of X if and only if its codimension in X is zero. If $X = \operatorname{Spec} A$ is affine, then the codimension of Y in X is precisely the height of the prime ideal defining Y in X.

== Examples ==
- If a finite-dimensional vector space V over a field is viewed as a scheme over the field, (Note: The Spec of the symmetric algebra of the dual vector space of V is the scheme structure on $V$.) then the dimension of the scheme V is the same as the vector-space dimension of V.
- Let $X = \operatorname{Spec} k[x, y, z]/(xy, xz)$, k a field. Then it has dimension 2 (since it contains the hyperplane $H = \{ x = 0 \} \subset \mathbb{A}^3$ as an irreducible component). If x is a closed point of X, then $\operatorname{codim}(x, X)$ is 2 if x lies in H and is 1 if it is in $X - H$. Thus, $\operatorname{codim}(x, X)$ for closed points x can vary.
- Let $X$ be an algebraic pre-variety; i.e., an integral scheme of finite type over a field $k$. Then the dimension of $X$ is the transcendence degree of the function field $k(X)$ of $X$ over $k$. Also, if $U$ is a nonempty open subset of $X$, then $\dim U = \dim X$.
- Let R be a discrete valuation ring and $X = \mathbb{A}^1_R = \operatorname{Spec}(R[t])$ the affine line over it. Let $\pi: X \to \operatorname{Spec}R$ be the projection. $\operatorname{Spec}(R) = \{ s, \eta \}$ consists of 2 points, $s$ corresponding to the maximal ideal and closed and $\eta$ the zero ideal and open. Then the fibers $\pi^{-1}(s), \pi^{-1}(\eta)$ are closed and open, respectively. We note that $\pi^{-1}(\eta)$ has dimension one, (Note: In fact, by definition, $\pi^{-1}(\eta)$ is the fiber product of $\pi: X \to \operatorname{Spec}(R)$ and $\eta = \operatorname{Spec}(k(\eta)) \to \operatorname{Spec} R$ and so it is the Spec of $R[t] \otimes_R k(\eta) = k(\eta)[t]$.) while $X$ has dimension $2 = 1 + \dim R$ and $\pi^{-1}(\eta)$ is dense in $X$. Thus, the dimension of the closure of an open subset can be strictly bigger than that of the open set.
- Continuing the same example, let $\mathfrak{m}_R$ be the maximal ideal of R and $\omega_R$ a generator. We note that $R[t]$ has height-two and height-one maximal ideals; namely, $\mathfrak{p}_1 = (\omega_R t - 1)$ and $\mathfrak{p}_2 =$ the kernel of $R[t] \to R/\mathfrak{m}_R, f \mapsto f(0) \bmod\mathfrak{m}_R$. The first ideal $\mathfrak{p}_1$ is maximal since $R[t]/(\omega_R t - 1) = R[\omega_R^{-1}] =$ the field of fractions of R. Also, $\mathfrak{p}_1$ has height one by Krull's principal ideal theorem and $\mathfrak{p}_2$ has height two since $\mathfrak{m}_R[t] \subsetneq \mathfrak{p}_2$. Consequently,

$$\operatorname{codim}(\mathfrak{p}_1, X) = 1, \, \operatorname{codim}(\mathfrak{p}_2, X) = 2,$$

while X is irreducible.

== Equidimensional scheme ==
An equidimensional scheme (or, pure dimensional scheme) is a scheme whose irreducible components are of the same dimension (implicitly assuming the dimensions are all well-defined).

=== Examples ===
All irreducible schemes are equidimensional.

In an affine space, the union of a line and a point not on the line is not equidimensional. Generally, if two closed subschemes of some scheme, neither containing the other, have unequal dimensions, then their union is not equidimensional.

If a scheme is smooth (for instance, étale) over Spec k for some field k, then every connected component (which is then, in fact, an irreducible component) is equidimensional.

== Relative dimension ==
Let $f: X\rightarrow Y$ be a morphism locally of finite type between two schemes $X$ and $Y$. The relative dimension of $f$ at a point $y \in Y$ is the dimension of the fiber $f^{-1} (y)$. If all the nonempty fibers are purely of the same dimension $n$, then one says that $f$ is of relative dimension $n$.

== See also ==
- Kleiman's theorem
- Glossary of scheme theory
- Equidimensional ring
