= Algebraic function field =

Finitely generated extension field of positive transcendence degree

In mathematics, an algebraic function field (often abbreviated as function field) of $n$ variables over a field $k$ is a finitely generated field extension $K/k$ which has transcendence degree $n$ over $k$. Equivalently, an algebraic function field of $n$ variables over $k$ may be defined as a finite field extension of the field $K=k(x_1,\dots,x_n)$ of rational functions in $n$ variables over $k$.

== Example ==
As an example, in the polynomial ring $k[x,y]$ consider the ideal generated by the irreducible polynomial $y^2-x^3$ and form the field of fractions of the quotient ring $k[x,y]/(y^2-x^3)$. This is a function field of one variable over $k$; it can also be written as $k(x)(\sqrt{x^3})$ (with degree 2 over $k(x)$) or as $k(y)(\sqrt[3]{y^2})$ (with degree 3 over $k(y)$). We see that the degree of an algebraic function field is not a well-defined notion.

== Category structure ==
The algebraic function fields over $k$ form a category; the morphisms from function field $K$ to $L$ are the ring homomorphisms $f:K\to L$ with $f(a)=a$ for all $a$ in $k$. All these morphisms are injective. If $K$ is a function field over $k$ of $n$ variables, and $L$ is a function field in $m$ variables, and $n>m$, then there are no morphisms from $K$ to $L$.

== Function fields arising from varieties, curves and Riemann surfaces ==
The function field of an algebraic variety of dimension $n$ over $k$ is an algebraic function field of $n$ variables over $k$. Two varieties are birationally equivalent if and only if their function fields are isomorphic (but note that non-isomorphic varieties may have the same function field). Assigning to each variety its function field yields a duality (contravariant equivalence) between the category of varieties over $k$ (with dominant rational maps as morphisms) and the category of algebraic function fields over $k$. The varieties considered here are to be taken in the scheme sense; they need not have any $k$-rational points, like the curve $x^2+y^2+1=0$ defined over the real numbers.

The case $n=1$ (irreducible algebraic curves in the scheme sense) is especially important, since every function field of one variable over $k$ arises as the function field of a uniquely defined regular (i.e. non-singular) projective irreducible algebraic curve over $k$. In fact, the function field yields a duality between the category of regular projective irreducible algebraic curves (with dominant regular maps as morphisms) and the category of function fields of one variable over $k$.

The field $M(X)$ of meromorphic functions defined on a connected Riemann surface $X$ is a function field of one variable over the complex numbers $\C$. In fact, $M(X)$ yields a duality between the category of compact connected Riemann surfaces (with non-constant holomorphic maps as morphisms) and function fields of one variable over $\C$. A similar correspondence exists between compact connected Klein surfaces and function fields in one variable over $\R$.

== Number fields and finite fields ==
The function field analogy states that almost all theorems on number fields have a counterpart on function fields of one variable over a finite field, and these counterparts are frequently easier to prove (see analogue for irreducible polynomials over a finite field). In the context of this analogy, both number fields and function fields over finite fields are usually called "global fields".

The study of function fields over a finite field has applications in cryptography and error correcting codes. For example, the function field of an elliptic curve over a finite field (an important mathematical tool for public key cryptography) is an algebraic function field.

Function fields over the field of rational numbers play also an important role in solving inverse Galois problems.

== Field of constants ==
Given any algebraic function field $K$ over $k$, we can consider the set of elements of $K$ which are algebraic over $k$. These elements form a field, known as the field of constants of the algebraic function field.

For instance, $\C(x)$ is a function field of one variable over $\R$; its field of constants is $\C$.

== Valuations and places ==
Key tools to study algebraic function fields are absolute values, valuations, places and their completions.

Given an algebraic function field $K/k$ of one variable, we define the notion of a valuation ring of $K/k$: this is a subring $\mathcal{O}$ of $K$ that contains $k$ and is different from $k$ and $K$, and such that for any $x$ in $K$ we have $x\in\mathcal{O}$ or $x^{-1}\in\mathcal{O}$. Each such valuation ring is a discrete valuation ring and its maximal ideal is called a place of $K/k$.

A discrete valuation of $K/k$ is a surjective function $v:K\to\Z\cup\{\infty\}$ such that for all $x,y\in K$,

- $v(xy)=v(x)+v(y)$,
- $v(x+y)\geq \min\{v(x),v(y)\}$,
- $v(x)=\infty \iff x=0$

and $v(a)=0$ for all $a\in k\setminus \{0\}$.

There are natural bijective correspondences between the set of valuation rings of $K/k$, the set of places of $K/k$, and the set of discrete valuations of $K/k$. These sets can be given a natural topological structure: the Zariski–Riemann space of $K/k$.

== See also ==
- function field of an algebraic variety
- function field (scheme theory)
- algebraic function
- Drinfeld module
