= Closed point =

Point not touching any other point

In mathematics, a closed point of a topological space is a point whose singleton is closed. In many areas of geometry and topology, all spaces under consideration are T_{1} spaces that only have closed points. The distinction between closed and non-closed points is most often made in algebraic geometry, where schemes can have non-closed points.

== Definition and motivation ==
If $X$ is a topological space, a point $x \in X$ is called closed if the singleton $\{x\}$ is closed. An equivalent statement is that the closure $\overline{\{x\}}$ only contains $x$.

The closed points of a space $X$ can also be defined using the specialization preorder on $X$. Given points $x,y \in X$, $x$ specializes to $y$ if $y \in \overline{\{x\}}$. This means that the closed points of a topological space are those that specialize to no point except themselves, that is, the most specific points. (Note: There is no general agreement on whether "more specific" should be regarded as lower or higher. Depending on this, the closed points can be either minimal, or maximal.)

Spaces where every point is closed, called T_{1} spaces, are common. In most branches of mathematics, it is rare to encounter spaces that have any non-closed points. Many mathematicians regard such spaces as somewhat strange. For example, if $x$ specializes to $y$, the constant sequence $(x,x,x,...)$ converges to $y$ (as well as $x$).

In algebraic geometry, schemes usually have many non-closed points, including points whose closure $\overline{\{x\}}$ is rather large. In particular, every irreducible component of a scheme $X$ is of the form $\overline{\{x\}}$ for some $x \in X$. This can make the study of schemes easier since some properties of $x$ extend to the entirety of $\overline{\{x\}}$.

== Examples ==
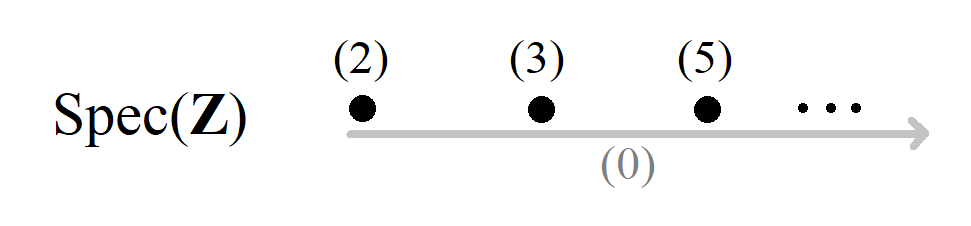
The spectrum of Z, which is a PID. The generic point is depicted as a grey line that contains all other points.

- Most of the typical examples of spaces are Hausdorff, and in particular T_{1}. This includes manifolds. Other examples of T_{1} spaces include non-Hausdorff manifolds, algebraic varieties, and spaces with the cofinite topology.
- When an algebraic variety is considered as a scheme, every Zariski-closed subvariety of it is endowed with an additional point, which is generic in that subvariety. The original points of the variety are the closed points of the resulting scheme.
- In the spectrum of a commutative ring, the points are the prime ideals of the ring, and the closed points are the maximal ideals.
- In particular, the points of the spectrum of a principal ideal domain are the ideals generated by prime elements (defined up to a unit) and the zero ideal. The points that correspond to prime elements are closed, and the point that corresponds to zero is generic.
- The Sierpiński space has two points. One of them is closed, and the other is non-closed since it specializes to the first point.
- The closed points of a partially ordered set with the Alexandrov topology are the minimal elements.
- If two points are topologically indistinguishable, the closure of either of them contains both and hence neither of them is closed.

== Properties ==
In any scheme that is locally of finite type over a field, the set of closed points is dense. In particular, this is true for schemes that correspond to algebraic varieties. This is not always the case, even for an affine scheme. For example, the spectrum of a discrete valuation ring is (topologically) the aforementioned Sierpiński space. Nonempty quasi-compact schemes (and in particular affine schemes) must have at least one closed point. However, there are schemes without any closed points at all, including irreducible schemes.

In any scheme that is locally of finite type over a field $k$, the residue field is finite over $k$ at closed points and transcendental over $k$ at non-closed points. In particular, if $k$ is algebraically closed, the closed points are exactly those where the residue field is $k$ itself. This implies that every $k$-rational point is closed, and if $k$ is algebraically closed then the closed points are exactly the $k$-rational points. In a scheme of finite type over $\mathbb{Z}$, the closed points are exactly the points where the residue field is finite, and each finite field is the residue field at only finitely many points. This makes it possible to define the arithmetic zeta function of such a scheme.

Let $X$ be affine scheme (or equivalently, a spectral space). $X$ is normal if and only if its closed points can be separated by neighborhoods. If the space of closed points of $X$ is connected, $X$ is connected too, and the converse holds if $X$ is normal. If $X$ is normal, the space of closed points of $X$ is compact (and Hausdorff). A normal affine scheme is simply the spectrum of a commutative Gelfand ring, so these are in fact properties of the maximal spectra of such rings.

== Locally closed point ==
A locally closed point, or a Goldman point, is a point $x \in X$ such that the singleton $\{x\}$ is locally closed. This is equivalent to the condition that $x$ is isolated in $\overline{\{x\}}$. Every closed point is locally closed.

Unlike the case of closed points, the locally closed points are dense in every affine scheme.
