= Residue field =

Field arising from a quotient ring by a maximal ideal

In mathematics, the residue field is a basic construction in commutative algebra. If $R$ is a commutative ring and $\mathfrak{m}$ is a maximal ideal, then the residue field is the quotient ring $k=R/\mathfrak{m}$, which is a field. Frequently, $R$ is a local ring and $\mathfrak{m}$ is then its unique maximal ideal.

In abstract algebra, the splitting field of a polynomial is constructed using residue fields. Residue fields also applied in algebraic geometry, where to every point $x$ of a scheme $X$ one associates its residue field $k(x)$. One can say a little loosely that the residue field of a point of an abstract algebraic variety is the natural domain for the coordinates of the point.

== Definition ==
Suppose that $R$ is a commutative local ring, with maximal ideal $\mathfrak{m}$. Then the residue field is the quotient ring $R/\mathfrak{m}$.

Now suppose that $X$ is a scheme and $x$ is a point of $X$. By the definition of a scheme, we may find an affine neighbourhood $\mathcal{U} = \text{Spec}(A)$ of $x$, with some commutative ring $A$. Considered in the neighbourhood $\mathcal{U}$, the point $x$ corresponds to a prime ideal $\mathfrak{p} \subseteq A$ (see Zariski topology). The local ring of $X$ at $x$ is by definition the localization $A_{\mathfrak{p}}$ of $A$ by $A\setminus \mathfrak{p}$, and $A_{\mathfrak{p}}$ has maximal ideal $\mathfrak{m}=\mathfrak{p} A_{\mathfrak{p}}$. Applying the construction above, we obtain the residue field of the point $x$:

$$k(x) := A_{\mathfrak{p}}/\mathfrak{p} A_{\mathfrak{p}}$$.

Since localization is exact, $k(x)$ is the field of fractions of $A/\mathfrak p$ (which is an integral domain as $\mathfrak p$ is a prime ideal). One can prove that this definition does not depend on the choice of the affine neighbourhood $\mathcal{U}$.

A point is called $\color{blue}k$-rational for a certain field $k$, if $k(x)=k$.

== Example ==
Consider the affine line $\mathbb{A}^1(k)=\operatorname{Spec}(k[t])$ over a field $k$. If $k$ is algebraically closed, there are exactly two types of prime ideals, namely

- $(t-a),\,a \in k$
- $(0)$, the zero-ideal.

The residue fields are

- $k[t]_{(t-a)}/(t-a)k[t]_{(t-a)} \cong k$
- $k[t]_{(0)} \cong k(t)$, the function field over k in one variable.

If $k$ is not algebraically closed, then more types arise from the irreducible polynomials of degree greater than 1. For example if $k=\mathbb{R}$, then the prime ideals generated by quadratic irreducible polynomials (such as $x^2+1$) all have residue field isomorphic to $\mathbb{C}$.

== Properties ==
- For a scheme locally of finite type over a field $k$, a point $x$ is closed if and only if $k(x)$ is a finite extension of the base field $k$. This is a geometric formulation of Hilbert's Nullstellensatz. In the above example, the points of the first kind are closed, having residue field $k$, whereas the second point is the generic point, having transcendence degree 1 over $k$.
- A morphism $\operatorname{Spec}(K) \rightarrow X$, $K$ some field, is equivalent to giving a point $x \in X$ and an extension $K/k(x)$.
- The dimension of a scheme of finite type over a field is equal to the transcendence degree of the residue field of the generic point.

== See also ==
- Arithmetic zeta function
