= Regular scheme =

In algebraic geometry, a regular scheme is a locally Noetherian scheme whose local rings are regular everywhere. Every smooth scheme is regular, and every regular scheme of finite type over a perfect field is smooth.

For an example of a regular scheme that is not smooth, see Geometrically regular ring § Examples.

== See also ==
- Étale morphism
- Dimension of an algebraic variety
- Glossary of scheme theory
- Smooth completion
