= Function field of an algebraic variety =

Mathematical concept in algebraic geometry

In algebraic geometry, the function field of an algebraic variety V consists of objects that are interpreted as rational functions on V. In classical algebraic geometry they are ratios of polynomials; in complex geometry these are meromorphic functions and their higher-dimensional analogues; in modern algebraic geometry they are elements of some quotient ring's field of fractions.

== Definition for complex manifolds ==
In complex geometry the objects of study are complex analytic varieties, on which we have a local notion of complex analysis, through which we may define meromorphic functions. The function field of a variety is then the set of all meromorphic functions on the variety. (Like all meromorphic functions, these take their values in $\mathbb{C}\cup\{\infty\}$.) Together with the operations of addition and multiplication of functions, this is a field in the sense of algebra.

For the Riemann sphere, which is the variety $\mathbb{P}^1$ over the complex numbers, the global meromorphic functions are exactly the rational functions (that is, the ratios of complex polynomial functions).

== Construction in algebraic geometry ==
In classical algebraic geometry, we generalize the second point of view. For the Riemann sphere, above, the notion of a polynomial is not defined globally, but simply with respect to an affine coordinate chart, namely that consisting of the complex plane (all but the north pole of the sphere). On a general variety V, we say that a rational function on an open affine subset U is defined as the ratio of two polynomials in the affine coordinate ring of U, and that a rational function on all of V consists of such local data as agree on the intersections of open affines. We may define the function field of V to be the field of fractions of the affine coordinate ring of any open affine subset, since all such subsets are dense.

== Generalization to arbitrary scheme ==
In the most general setting, that of modern scheme theory, the latter point of view above is taken as a point of departure. Namely, if $X$ is an integral scheme, then for every open affine subset $U$ of $X$ the ring of sections $\mathcal{O}_X(U)$ on $U$ is an integral domain and, hence, has a field of fractions. Furthermore, it can be verified that these are all the same, and are all equal to the stalk of the generic point of $X$. Thus the function field of $X$ is just the stalk of its generic point.

== Geometry of the function field ==
If V is a variety defined over a field K, then the function field K(V) is a finitely generated field extension of the ground field K; its transcendence degree is equal to the dimension of the variety. All extensions of K that are finitely generated as fields over K arise in this way from some algebraic variety. These field extensions are also known as algebraic function fields over K.

Properties of the variety V that depend only on the function field are studied in birational geometry.

== Examples ==
The function field of a point over K is K.

The function field of the affine line over K is isomorphic to the field K(t) of rational functions in one variable. This is also the function field of the projective line.

Consider the affine algebraic plane curve defined by the equation $y^2 = x^5 + 1$. Its function field is the field K(x,y), generated by elements x and y that are transcendental over K and satisfy the algebraic relation $y^2 = x^5 + 1$.

== See also ==
- Algebraic function field
- Cartier divisor
