= Ultraconnected space =

Property of topological spaces

In mathematics, a topological space is said to be ultraconnected if no two nonempty closed sets are disjoint. Equivalently, a space is ultraconnected if and only if the closures of two distinct points always have non trivial intersection. Hence, no T_{1} space with more than one point is ultraconnected.

== Properties ==
Every ultraconnected space $X$ is path-connected (but not necessarily arc connected). If $a$ and $b$ are two points of $X$ and $p$ is a point in the intersection $\operatorname{cl}\{a\}\cap\operatorname{cl}\{b\}$, the function $f:[0,1]\to X$ defined by $f(t)=a$ if $0 \le t < 1/2$, $f(1/2)=p$ and $f(t)=b$ if $1/2 < t \le 1$, is a continuous path between $a$ and $b$.

Every ultraconnected space is normal, limit point compact, and pseudocompact.

== Examples ==
The following are examples of ultraconnected topological spaces.

- A set with the indiscrete topology.
- The Sierpiński space.
- A set with the excluded point topology.
- The right order topology on the real line.

== See also ==
- Hyperconnected space
