= Radicial morphism =

In algebraic geometry, a morphism of schemes

f: X → Y

is called radicial or universally injective, if, for every field K, the induced map X(K) → Y(K) is injective (EGA I (1960), (3.5.4)), (EGA I (1971), (3.7.2)). This is a generalization of the notion of a purely inseparable extension of fields (sometimes called a radicial extension, which should not be confused with a radical extension).

It suffices to check this for K algebraically closed.

This is equivalent to the following condition: f is injective on the topological spaces and for every point x in X, the extension of the residue fields

k(f(x)) ⊂ k(x)

is radicial, i.e. purely inseparable.

It is also equivalent to every base change of f being injective on the underlying topological spaces. (Thus the term universally injective.)

Radicial morphisms are stable under composition, products and base change. If gf is radicial, so is f.
