= Degree of an algebraic variety =

Number used in algebraic geometry

In mathematics, the degree of an affine or projective variety of dimension n is the number of intersection points of the variety with n hyperplanes in general position. For an algebraic set, the intersection points must be counted with their intersection multiplicity, because of the possibility of multiple components. For (irreducible) varieties, if one takes into account the multiplicities and, in the affine case, the points at infinity, the hypothesis of general position may be replaced by the much weaker condition that the intersection of the variety has the dimension zero (that is, consists of a finite number of points). This is a generalization of Bézout's theorem. (For a proof, see Hilbert series and Hilbert polynomial § Degree of a projective variety and Bézout's theorem.)

The degree is not an intrinsic property of the variety, as it depends on a specific embedding of the variety in an affine or projective space.

The degree of a hypersurface is equal to the total degree of its defining equation. A generalization of Bézout's theorem asserts that, if an intersection of n projective hypersurfaces has codimension n, then the degree of the intersection is the product of the degrees of the hypersurfaces.

The degree of a projective variety is the evaluation at 1 of the numerator of the Hilbert series of its coordinate ring. It follows that, given the equations of the variety, the degree may be computed from a Gröbner basis of the ideal of these equations.

== Definition ==
For V embedded in a projective space P^{n} and defined over some algebraically closed field K, the degree d of V is the number of points of intersection of V, defined over K, with a linear subspace L in general position, such that

$$\dim(V) + \dim(L) = n.$$

Here dim(V) is the dimension of V, and the codimension of L will be equal to that dimension. The degree d is an extrinsic quantity, and not intrinsic as a property of V. For example, the projective line has an (essentially unique) embedding of degree n in P^{n}.

== Properties ==
The degree of a hypersurface F = 0 is the same as the total degree of the homogeneous polynomial F defining it (granted, in case F has repeated factors, that intersection theory is used to count intersections with multiplicity, as in Bézout's theorem).

If two varieties Y and Z intersect transversally, then the degree of their intersection is the product of their degrees: deg Y ∩ Z = (deg Y)(deg Z).

== Other approaches ==
For a more sophisticated approach, the linear system of divisors defining the embedding of V can be related to the line bundle or invertible sheaf defining the embedding by its space of sections. The tautological line bundle on P^{n} pulls back to V. The degree determines the first Chern class. The degree can also be computed in the cohomology ring of P^{n}, or Chow ring, with the class of a hyperplane intersecting the class of V an appropriate number of times.

== Extending Bézout's theorem ==
The degree can be used to generalize Bézout's theorem in an expected way to intersections of n hypersurfaces in P^{n}.
