= Ind-scheme =

In algebraic geometry, an ind-scheme is a set-valued functor that can be written (represented) as a direct limit (i.e., inductive limit) of closed embedding of schemes.

== Examples ==
- $\mathbb{C}P^{\infty} = \varinjlim \mathbb{C}P^N$ is an ind-scheme.
- Perhaps the most famous example of an ind-scheme is an infinite grassmannian (which is a quotient of the loop group of an algebraic group G.)

== See also ==
- formal scheme
