= Smooth scheme =

Concept in algebraic geometry

In algebraic geometry, a smooth scheme over a field is a scheme which is well approximated by affine space near any point. Smoothness is one way of making precise the notion of a scheme with no singular points. A special case is the notion of a smooth variety over a field. Smooth schemes play the role in algebraic geometry of manifolds in topology.

== Definition ==
First, let X be an affine scheme of finite type over a field k. Equivalently, X has a closed immersion into affine space A^{n} over k for some natural number n. Then X is the closed subscheme defined by some equations g_{1} = 0, ..., g_{r} = 0, where each g_{i} is in the polynomial ring k[x_{1},..., x_{n}]. The affine scheme X is smooth of dimension m over k if X has dimension at least m in a neighborhood of each point, and the matrix of derivatives (∂g_{i}/∂x_{j}) has rank at least n−m everywhere on X. (It follows that X has dimension equal to m in a neighborhood of each point.) Smoothness is independent of the choice of immersion of X into affine space.

The condition on the matrix of derivatives is understood to mean that the closed subset of X where all (n−m) × (n − m) minors of the matrix of derivatives are zero is the empty set. Equivalently, the ideal in the polynomial ring generated by all g_{i} and all those minors is the whole polynomial ring.

In geometric terms, the matrix of derivatives (∂g_{i}/∂x_{j}) at a point p in X gives a linear map F^{n} → F^{r}, where F is the residue field of p. The kernel of this map is called the Zariski tangent space of X at p. Smoothness of X means that the dimension of the Zariski tangent space is equal to the dimension of X near each point; at a singular point, the Zariski tangent space would be bigger.

More generally, a scheme X over a field k is smooth over k if each point of X has an open neighborhood which is a smooth affine scheme of some dimension over k. In particular, a smooth scheme over k is locally of finite type.

There is a more general notion of a smooth morphism of schemes, which is roughly a morphism with smooth fibers. In particular, a scheme X is smooth over a field k if and only if the morphism X → Spec k is smooth.

== Properties ==
A smooth scheme over a field is regular and hence normal. In particular, a smooth scheme over a field is reduced.

Define a variety over a field k to be an integral separated scheme of finite type over k. Then any smooth separated scheme of finite type over k is a finite disjoint union of smooth varieties over k.

For a smooth variety X over the complex numbers, the space X(C) of complex points of X is a complex manifold, using the classical (Euclidean) topology. Likewise, for a smooth variety X over the real numbers, the space X(R) of real points is a real manifold, possibly empty.

For any scheme X that is locally of finite type over a field k, there is a coherent sheaf Ω^{1} of differentials on X. The scheme X is smooth over k if and only if Ω^{1} is a vector bundle of rank equal to the dimension of X near each point. In that case, Ω^{1} is called the cotangent bundle of X. The tangent bundle of a smooth scheme over k can be defined as the dual bundle, TX = (Ω^{1})^{*}.

Smoothness is a geometric property, meaning that for any field extension E of k, a scheme X is smooth over k if and only if the scheme X_{E} := X ×_{Spec k} Spec E is smooth over E. For a perfect field k, a scheme X is smooth over k if and only if X is locally of finite type over k and X is regular.

== Generic smoothness ==
A scheme X is said to be generically smooth of dimension n over k if X contains an open dense subset that is smooth of dimension n over k. Every variety over a perfect field (in particular an algebraically closed field) is generically smooth.

== Examples ==
- Affine space and projective space are smooth schemes over a field k.
- An example of a smooth hypersurface in projective space P^{n} over k is the Fermat hypersurface x_{0}^{d} + ... + x_{n}^{d} = 0, for any positive integer d that is invertible in k.
- An example of a singular (non-smooth) scheme over a field k is the closed subscheme x^{2} = 0 in the affine line A^{1} over k.
- An example of a singular (non-smooth) variety over k is the cuspidal cubic curve x^{2} = y^{3} in the affine plane A^{2}, which is smooth outside the origin (x,y) = (0,0).
- A 0-dimensional variety X over a field k is of the form X = Spec E, where E is a finite extension field of k. The variety X is smooth over k if and only if E is a separable extension of k. Thus, if E is not separable over k, then X is a regular scheme but is not smooth over k. For example, let k be the field of rational functions F_{p}(t) for a prime number p, and let E = F_{p}(t^{1/p}); then Spec E is a variety of dimension 0 over k which is a regular scheme, but not smooth over k.
- Schubert varieties are in general not smooth.

== See also ==
- Étale morphism
- Dimension of an algebraic variety
- Glossary of scheme theory
- Smooth completion
