= Generic point =

Concept in algebraic geometry

In algebraic geometry, a generic point P of an algebraic variety X is a point in a general position, at which all generic properties are true, a generic property being a property which is true for almost every point.

In classical algebraic geometry, a generic point of an affine or projective algebraic variety of dimension d is a point such that the field generated by its coordinates has transcendence degree d over the field generated by the coefficients of the equations of the variety.

In scheme theory, the spectrum of an integral domain has a unique generic point, which is the zero ideal. As the closure of this point for the Zariski topology is the whole spectrum, the definition has been extended to general topology, where a generic point of a topological space X is a point whose closure is X.

== Definition and motivation ==
A generic point of the topological space X is a point P whose closure is all of X, that is, a point that is dense in X.

The terminology arises from the case of the Zariski topology on the set of subvarieties of an algebraic set: the algebraic set is irreducible (that is, it is not the union of two proper algebraic subsets) if and only if the topological space of the subvarieties has a generic point.

== Examples ==
- The only Hausdorff space that has a generic point is the singleton set.
- Any integral scheme has a (unique) generic point; in the case of an affine integral scheme (i.e., the prime spectrum of an integral domain) the generic point is the point associated to the prime ideal (0).

== History ==
In the foundational approach of André Weil, developed in his Foundations of Algebraic Geometry, generic points played an important role, but were handled in a different manner. For an algebraic variety V over a field K, generic points of V were a whole class of points of V taking values in a universal domain Ω, an algebraically closed field containing K but also an infinite supply of fresh indeterminates. This approach worked, without any need to deal directly with the topology of V (K-Zariski topology, that is), because the specializations could all be discussed at the field level (as in the valuation theory approach to algebraic geometry, popular in the 1930s).

This was at a cost of there being a huge collection of equally generic points. Oscar Zariski, a colleague of Weil's at São Paulo just after World War II, always insisted that generic points should be unique. (This can be put back into topologists' terms: Weil's idea fails to give a Kolmogorov space and Zariski thinks in terms of the Kolmogorov quotient.)

In the rapid foundational changes of the 1950s Weil's approach became obsolete. In scheme theory, though, from 1957, generic points returned: this time à la Zariski. For example for R a discrete valuation ring, Spec(R) consists of two points, a generic point (coming from the prime ideal {0}) and a closed point or special point coming from the unique maximal ideal. For morphisms to Spec(R), the fiber above the special point is the special fiber, an important concept for example in reduction modulo p, monodromy theory and other theories about degeneration. The generic fiber, equally, is the fiber above the generic point. Geometry of degeneration is largely then about the passage from generic to special fibers, or in other words how specialization of parameters affects matters. (For a discrete valuation ring the topological space in question is the Sierpinski space of topologists. Other local rings have unique generic and special points, but a more complicated spectrum, since they represent general dimensions. The discrete valuation case is much like the complex unit disk, for these purposes.)
