= Algebraic element =

Concept in abstract algebra

In mathematics, if A is an associative algebra over K, then an element a of A is an algebraic element over K, or just algebraic over K, if there exists some non-zero polynomial $g(x) \in K[x]$ with coefficients in K such that g(a) = 0. Elements of A that are not algebraic over K are transcendental over K. A special case of an associative algebra over $K$ is an extension field $L$ of $K$. If all elements of $L$ are algebraic over $K$, then $L/K$ is called an algebraic extension.

These notions generalize the algebraic numbers and the transcendental numbers (where the field extension is C/Q, with C being the field of complex numbers and Q being the field of rational numbers).

== Examples ==
- The square root of 2 is algebraic over Q, since it is the root of the polynomial g(x) = x^{2} − 2 whose coefficients are rational.
- Pi is transcendental over Q but algebraic over the field of real numbers R: it is the root of g(x) = x − π, whose coefficients (1 and −π) are both real, but not of any polynomial with only rational coefficients. (The definition of the term transcendental number uses C/Q, not C/R.)
- An indeterminate x in a field K(x) of rational functions or K((x)) of formal Laurent series is defined to be transcendental over K.
- Algebraic functions are the algebraic elements over a field of rational functions K(x_{1}, ..., x_{m}).

== Properties ==
The following conditions are equivalent for an element $a$ of an extension field $L$ of $K$:

- $a$ is algebraic over $K$,
- the field extension $K(a)/K$ is algebraic, i.e. every element of $K(a)$ is algebraic over $K$ (here $K(a)$ denotes the smallest subfield of $L$ containing $K$ and $a$),
- the field extension $K(a)/K$ has finite degree, i.e. the dimension of $K(a)$ as a $K$-vector space is finite,
- $K[a] = K(a)$, where $K[a]$ is the set of all elements of $L$ that can be written in the form $g(a)$ with a polynomial $g$ whose coefficients lie in $K$.

To make this more explicit, consider the polynomial evaluation $\varepsilon_a: K[X] \rightarrow K(a),\, P \mapsto P(a)$. This is a homomorphism and its kernel is $\{P \in K[X] \mid P(a) = 0 \}$. If $a$ is algebraic, this ideal contains non-zero polynomials, but as $K[X]$ is a euclidean domain, it contains a unique polynomial $p$ with minimal degree and leading coefficient $1$, which then also generates the ideal and must be irreducible. The polynomial $p$ is called the minimal polynomial of $a$ and it encodes many important properties of $a$. Hence the ring isomorphism $K[X]/(p) \rightarrow \mathrm{im}(\varepsilon_a)$ obtained by the homomorphism theorem is an isomorphism of fields, where we can then observe that $\mathrm{im}(\varepsilon_a) = K(a)$. Otherwise, $\varepsilon_a$ is injective and hence we obtain a field isomorphism $K(X) \rightarrow K(a)$, where $K(X)$ is the field of fractions of $K[X]$, i.e. the field of rational functions on $K$, by the universal property of the field of fractions. We can conclude that in any case, we find an isomorphism $K(a) \cong K[X]/(p)$ or $K(a) \cong K(X)$. Investigating this construction yields the desired results.

This characterization can be used to show that the sum, difference, product and quotient of algebraic elements over $K$ are again algebraic over $K$. For if $a$ and $b$ are both algebraic, then $(K(a))(b)$ is finite. As it contains the aforementioned combinations of $a$ and $b$, adjoining one of them to $K$ also yields a finite extension, and therefore these elements are algebraic as well. Thus set of all elements of $L$ that are algebraic over $K$ is a field that sits in between $L$ and $K$.

Fields that do not allow any algebraic elements over them (except their own elements) are called algebraically closed. The field of complex numbers is an example. If $L$ is algebraically closed, then the field of algebraic elements of $L$ over $K$ is algebraically closed, which can again be directly shown using the characterisation of simple algebraic extensions above. An example for this is the field of algebraic numbers.

== See also ==
- Algebraic closure
- Algebraic independence
- Integral element
