= Hyperconnected space =

In the mathematical field of topology, a hyperconnected space or irreducible space is a topological space X that cannot be written as the union of two proper closed subsets (whether disjoint or non-disjoint). The name irreducible space is preferred in algebraic geometry.

For a topological space X the following conditions are equivalent:

- No two nonempty open sets are disjoint.
- X cannot be written as the union of two proper closed subsets.
- Every nonempty open set is dense in X.
- Every open set is connected.
- The interior of every proper closed subset of X is empty.
- Every subset is dense or nowhere dense in X.
- No two points can be separated by disjoint neighbourhoods.

A space which satisfies any one of these conditions is called hyperconnected or irreducible. Due to the condition about neighborhoods of distinct points being in a sense the opposite of the Hausdorff property, some authors call such spaces anti-Hausdorff.

The empty set is vacuously a hyperconnected or irreducible space under the definition above (because it contains no nonempty open sets). However some authors, especially those interested in applications to algebraic geometry, add an explicit condition that an irreducible space must be nonempty.

An irreducible set is a subset of a topological space for which the subspace topology is irreducible.

== Examples ==
Two examples of hyperconnected spaces from point set topology are the cofinite topology on any infinite set and the right order topology on $\mathbb{R}$.

In algebraic geometry, taking the spectrum of a ring whose reduced ring is an integral domain is an irreducible topological space—applying the lattice theorem to the nilradical, which is within every prime, to show the spectrum of the quotient map is a homeomorphism, this reduces to the irreducibility of the spectrum of an integral domain. For example, the schemes

$\text{Spec}\left( \frac{\mathbb{Z}[x,y,z]}{x^4 + y^3 + z^2} \right)$ , $\text{Proj}\left( \frac{\mathbb{C}[x,y,z]}{(y^2z - x(x-z)(x-2z))} \right)$

are irreducible since in both cases the polynomials defining the ideal are irreducible polynomials (meaning they have no non-trivial factorization). A non-example is given by the normal crossing divisor

$\text{Spec}\left( \frac{\mathbb{C}[x,y,z]}{(xyz)} \right)$

since the underlying space is the union of the affine planes $\mathbb{A}^2_{x,y}$, $\mathbb{A}^2_{x,z}$, and $\mathbb{A}^2_{y,z}$. Another non-example is given by the scheme

$\text{Proj}\left( \frac{\mathbb{C}[x,y,z,w]}{(xy, f_4)} \right)$

where $f_4$ is an irreducible degree 4 homogeneous polynomial. This is the union of the two genus 3 curves (by the genus–degree formula)

$\text{Proj}\left( \frac{\mathbb{C}[y,z,w]}{(f_4(0,y,z,w))} \right), \text{ } \text{Proj}\left( \frac{\mathbb{C}[x,z,w]}{(f_4(x,0,z,w))} \right)$

== Hyperconnectedness vs. connectedness ==
Every hyperconnected space is both connected and locally connected (though not necessarily path-connected or locally path-connected).

Note that in the definition of hyper-connectedness, the closed sets need not be disjoint. This is in contrast to the definition of connectedness, in which the open sets are disjoint.

For example, the space of real numbers with the standard topology is connected but not hyperconnected. This is because it cannot be written as the union of two disjoint open sets, but it can be written as the union of two (non-disjoint) closed sets.

== Properties ==
- The nonempty open subsets of a hyperconnected space are "large" in the sense that each one is dense in X and any pair of them intersects. Thus, a hyperconnected space cannot be Hausdorff if it contains more than one point.
- Every hyperconnected space is both connected and locally connected (though not necessarily path-connected or locally path-connected).
- Since the closure of every non-empty open set in a hyperconnected space is the whole space, which is an open set, every hyperconnected space is extremally disconnected.
- The image of a hyperconnected space under a continuous function is hyperconnected. In particular, any continuous function from a hyperconnected space to a Hausdorff space must be constant. It follows that every hyperconnected space is pseudocompact.
- Every open subspace of a hyperconnected space is hyperconnected.

Proof: Let $U\subset X$ be an open subset. Any two disjoint open subsets of $U$ would themselves be disjoint open subsets of $X$. So at least one of them must be empty.

- More generally, every dense subset of a hyperconnected space is hyperconnected.

Proof: Suppose $S$ is a dense subset of $X$ and $S=S_1\cup S_2$ with $S_1$, $S_2$ closed in $S$. Then $X=\overline S=\overline{S_1}\cup\overline{S_2}$. Since $X$ is hyperconnected, one of the two closures is the whole space $X$, say $\overline{S_1}=X$. This implies that $S_1$ is dense in $S$, and since it is closed in $S$, it must be equal to $S$.

- A closed subspace of a hyperconnected space need not be hyperconnected.

Counterexample: $\Bbbk^2$ with $\Bbbk$ an algebraically closed field (thus infinite) is hyperconnected in the Zariski topology, while $V=Z(XY)=Z(X)\cup Z(Y)\subset\Bbbk^2$ is closed and not hyperconnected.

- The closure of any irreducible set is irreducible.

Proof: Suppose $S\subseteq X$ where $S$ is irreducible and write $\operatorname{Cl}_X(S)=F\cup G$ for two closed subsets $F,G\subseteq \operatorname{Cl}_X(S)$ (and thus in $X$). $F':=F\cap S,\,G':=G\cap S$ are closed in $S$ and $S=F'\cup G'$ which implies $S\subseteq F$ or $S\subseteq G$, but then $\operatorname{Cl}_X(S)=F$ or $\operatorname{Cl}_X(S)=G$ by definition of closure.

- A space $X$ which can be written as $X=U_1\cup U_2$ with $U_1,U_2\subset X$ open and irreducible such that $U_1\cap U_2\ne\emptyset$ is irreducible.

Proof: Firstly, we notice that if $V$ is a non-empty open set in $X$ then it intersects both $U_1$ and $U_2$; indeed, suppose $V_1:=U_1\cap V\ne\emptyset$, then $V_1$ is dense in $U_1$, thus $\exists x\in\operatorname{Cl}_{U_1}(V_1)\cap U_2=U_1\cap U_2\ne\emptyset$ and $x\in U_2$ is a point of closure of $V_1$ which implies $V_1\cap U_2\ne\emptyset$ and a fortiori $V_2:=V\cap U_2\ne\emptyset$. Now $V=V\cap(U_1\cup U_2)=V_1\cup V_2$ and taking the closure $\operatorname{Cl}_{X}(V)\supseteq{\operatorname{Cl}}_{U_1}(V_1)\cup{\operatorname{Cl}}_{U_2}(V_2)=U_1\cup U_2=X,$ therefore $V$ is a non-empty open and dense subset of $X$. Since this is true for every non-empty open subset, $X$ is irreducible.

== Irreducible components ==
An irreducible component in a topological space is a maximal irreducible subset (i.e. an irreducible set that is not contained in any larger irreducible set). The irreducible components are always closed.

Every irreducible subset of a space X is contained in a (not necessarily unique) irreducible component of X. In particular, every point of X is contained in some irreducible component of X. Unlike the connected components of a space, the irreducible components need not be disjoint (i.e. they need not form a partition). In general, the irreducible components will overlap.

The irreducible components of a Hausdorff space are just the singleton sets.

Since every irreducible space is connected, the irreducible components will always lie in the connected components.

Every Noetherian topological space has finitely many irreducible components.

== See also ==
- Ultraconnected space
- Sober space
- Geometrically irreducible
