= Morphism of finite type =

In commutative algebra, given a homomorphism $A\to B$ of commutative rings, $B$ is called an $A$-algebra of finite type if $B$ can be finitely generated as an $A$-algebra. It is much stronger for $B$ to be a finite $A$-algebra, which means that $B$ is finitely generated as an $A$-module. For example, for any commutative ring $A$ and natural number $n$, the polynomial ring $A[x_1,\dots,x_n]$ is an $A$-algebra of finite type, but it is not a finite $A$-algebra unless $A$ = 0 or $n$ = 0. Another example of a finite-type homomorphism that is not finite is $\mathbb{C}[t] \to \mathbb{C}[t][x,y]/(y^2 - x^3 - t)$.

The analogous notion in terms of schemes is that a morphism $f:X\to Y$ of schemes is of finite type if $Y$ has a covering by affine open subschemes $V_i=\operatorname{Spec}(A_i)$ such that $f^{-1}(V_i)$ has a finite covering by affine open subschemes $U_{ij}=\operatorname{Spec}(B_{ij})$ of $X$ with $B_{ij}$ an $A_i$-algebra of finite type. One also says that $X$ is of finite type over $Y$.

For example, for any natural number $n$ and field $k$, affine $n$-space and projective $n$-space over $k$ are of finite type over $k$ (that is, over $\operatorname{Spec}(k)$), while they are not finite over $k$ unless $n$ = 0. More generally, any quasi-projective scheme over $k$ is of finite type over $k$.

The Noether normalization lemma says, in geometric terms, that every affine scheme $X$ of finite type over a field $k$ has a finite surjective morphism to affine space $\mathbf{A}^n$ over $k$, where $n$ is the dimension of $X$. Likewise, every projective scheme $X$ over a field has a finite surjective morphism to projective space $\mathbf{P}^n$, where $n$ is the dimension of $X$.
