= Irreducible component =

Subset (often algebraic set) that is not the union of subsets of the same nature

In algebraic geometry, an irreducible algebraic set or irreducible variety is an algebraic set that cannot be written as the union of two proper algebraic subsets. An irreducible component of an algebraic set is an algebraic subset that is irreducible and maximal (for set inclusion) for this property. For example, the set of solutions of the equation xy = 0 is not irreducible, and its irreducible components are the two lines of equations x = 0 and y = 0.

It is a fundamental theorem of classical algebraic geometry that every algebraic set may be written in a unique way as a finite union of irreducible components.

These concepts can be reformulated in purely topological terms, using the Zariski topology, for which the closed sets are the algebraic subsets: A topological space is irreducible if it is not the union of two proper closed subsets, and an irreducible component is a maximal subspace (necessarily closed) that is irreducible for the induced topology. Although these concepts may be considered for every topological space, this is rarely done outside algebraic geometry, since most common topological spaces are Hausdorff spaces, and, in a Hausdorff space, the irreducible components are the singletons.

== In topology ==
A topological space X is reducible if it can be written as a union $X = X_1 \cup X_2$ of two closed proper subsets $X_1$, $X_2$ of $X.$ A topological space is irreducible (or hyperconnected) if it is not reducible. Equivalently, X is irreducible if all non empty open subsets of X are dense, or if any two nonempty open sets have nonempty intersection.

A subset F of a topological space X is called irreducible or reducible, if F considered as a topological space via the subspace topology has the corresponding property in the above sense. That is, $F$ is reducible if it can be written as a union $F = (G_1\cap F)\cup(G_2\cap F),$ where $G_1,G_2$ are closed subsets of $X$, neither of which contains $F.$

An irreducible component of a topological space is a maximal irreducible subset. If a subset is irreducible, its closure is also irreducible, so irreducible components are closed.

Every irreducible subset of a space X is contained in a (not necessarily unique) irreducible component of X. Every point $x\in X$ is contained in some irreducible component of X.

=== The empty topological space ===
The empty topological space vacuously satisfies the definition above for irreducible (since it has no proper subsets). However some authors, especially those interested in applications to algebraic topology, explicitly exclude the empty set from being irreducible. This article will not follow that convention.

== In algebraic geometry ==
Every affine or projective algebraic set is defined as the set of the zeros of an ideal in a polynomial ring. An irreducible algebraic set, more commonly known as an algebraic variety, is an algebraic set that cannot be decomposed as the union of two smaller algebraic sets. Lasker–Noether theorem implies that every algebraic set is the union of a finite number of uniquely defined algebraic sets, called its irreducible components. These notions of irreducibility and irreducible components are exactly the above defined ones, when the Zariski topology is considered, since the algebraic sets are exactly the closed sets of this topology.

The spectrum of a ring is a topological space whose points are the prime ideals and the closed sets are the sets of all prime ideals that contain a fixed ideal. For this topology, a closed set is irreducible if it is the set of all prime ideals that contain some prime ideal, and the irreducible components correspond to minimal prime ideals. The number of irreducible components is finite in the case of a Noetherian ring.

A scheme is obtained by gluing together spectra of rings in the same way that a manifold is obtained by gluing together charts. So the definition of irreducibility and irreducible components extends immediately to schemes.

== Examples ==
In a Hausdorff space, the irreducible subsets and the irreducible components are the singletons. This is the case, in particular, for the real numbers. In fact, if X is a set of real numbers that is not a singleton, there are three real numbers such that x ∈ X, y ∈ X, and x < a < y. The set X cannot be irreducible since $X=(X\cap ({-\infty}, a]) \cup (X\cap [a, \infty)).$

The notion of irreducible component is fundamental in algebraic geometry and rarely considered outside this area of mathematics: consider the algebraic subset of the plane

X = {(x, y) | xy = 0}.

For the Zariski topology, its closed subsets are itself, the empty set, the singletons, and the two lines defined by x = 0 and y = 0. The set X is thus reducible with these two lines as irreducible components.

The spectrum of a commutative ring is the set of the prime ideals of the ring, endowed with the Zariski topology, for which a set of prime ideals is closed if and only if it is the set of all prime ideals that contain a fixed ideal. In this case an irreducible subset is the set of all prime ideals that contain a fixed prime ideal.
