= List of algebraic geometry topics =

This is a list of algebraic geometry topics, by Wikipedia page.

== Classical topics in projective geometry ==
- Affine space
- Projective space
- Projective line, cross-ratio
- Projective plane
  - Line at infinity
  - Complex projective plane
- Complex projective space
- Plane at infinity, hyperplane at infinity
- Projective frame
- Projective transformation
- Fundamental theorem of projective geometry
- Duality (projective geometry)
- Real projective plane
- Real projective space
- Segre embedding of a product of projective spaces
- Rational normal curve

== Algebraic curves ==
- Conics, Pascal's theorem, Brianchon's theorem
- Twisted cubic
- Elliptic curve, cubic curve
  - Elliptic function, Jacobi's elliptic functions, Weierstrass's elliptic functions
  - Elliptic integral
  - Complex multiplication
  - Weil pairing
- Hyperelliptic curve
- Klein quartic
- Modular curve
  - Modular equation
  - Modular function
  - Modular group
  - Supersingular primes
- Fermat curve
- Bézout's theorem
- Brill–Noether theory
- Genus (mathematics)
- Riemann surface
- Riemann–Hurwitz formula
- Riemann–Roch theorem
- Abelian integral
- Differential of the first kind
- Jacobian variety
  - Generalized Jacobian
- Moduli of algebraic curves
- Hurwitz's theorem on automorphisms of a curve
- Clifford's theorem on special divisors
- Gonality of an algebraic curve
- Weil reciprocity law
- Algebraic geometry codes

== Algebraic surfaces ==
- Enriques–Kodaira classification
- List of algebraic surfaces
- Ruled surface
- Cubic surface
- Veronese surface
- Del Pezzo surface
- Rational surface
- Enriques surface
- K3 surface
- Hodge index theorem
- Elliptic surface
- Surface of general type
- Zariski surface

== Algebraic geometry: classical approach ==
- Algebraic variety
  - Hypersurface
  - Quadric (algebraic geometry)
  - Dimension of an algebraic variety
  - Hilbert's Nullstellensatz
  - Complete variety
  - Elimination theory
  - Gröbner basis
  - Projective variety
  - Quasiprojective variety
  - Canonical bundle
  - Complete intersection
  - Serre duality
  - Spaltenstein variety
  - Arithmetic genus, geometric genus, irregularity
- Tangent space, Zariski tangent space
- Function field of an algebraic variety
- Ample line bundle
- Ample vector bundle
- Linear system of divisors
- Birational geometry
  - Blowing up
  - Resolution of singularities
  - Rational variety
  - Unirational variety
  - Ruled variety
  - Kodaira dimension
  - Canonical ring
  - Minimal model program
- Intersection theory
  - Intersection number
  - Chow ring
  - Chern class
  - Serre's multiplicity conjectures
- Albanese variety
- Picard group
- Modular form
- Moduli space
- Modular equation
  - J-invariant
- Algebraic function
- Algebraic form
- Addition theorem
- Invariant theory
  - Symbolic method of invariant theory
- Geometric invariant theory
- Toric variety
- Deformation theory
- Singular point, non-singular
- Singularity theory
  - Newton polygon
- Weil conjectures

== Complex manifolds ==
- Kähler manifold
- Calabi–Yau manifold
- Stein manifold
- Hodge theory
- Hodge cycle
- Hodge conjecture
- Algebraic geometry and analytic geometry
- Mirror symmetry

== Algebraic groups ==
- Linear algebraic group
  - Additive group
  - Multiplicative group
  - Algebraic torus
  - Reductive group
  - Borel subgroup
  - Radical of an algebraic group
  - Unipotent radical
  - Lie–Kolchin theorem
  - Haboush's theorem (also known as the Mumford conjecture)
- Group scheme
- Abelian variety
  - Theta function
- Grassmannian
- Flag manifold
- Weil restriction
- Differential Galois theory

== Contemporary foundations ==
=== Commutative algebra ===
- Prime ideal
- Valuation (algebra)
- Krull dimension
- Regular local ring
- Regular sequence
- Cohen–Macaulay ring
- Gorenstein ring
- Koszul complex
- Spectrum of a ring
- Zariski topology
- Kähler differential
- Generic flatness
- Irrelevant ideal

=== Sheaf theory ===
- Locally ringed space
- Coherent sheaf
- Invertible sheaf
- Sheaf cohomology
- Coherent sheaf cohomology
- Hirzebruch–Riemann–Roch theorem
- Grothendieck–Riemann–Roch theorem
- Coherent duality
- Dévissage

=== Schemes ===
- Affine scheme
- Scheme
- Éléments de géométrie algébrique
- Grothendieck's Séminaire de géométrie algébrique
- Fiber product of schemes
- Flat morphism
- Smooth scheme
- Finite morphism
- Quasi-finite morphism
- Proper morphism
- Semistable elliptic curve
- Grothendieck's relative point of view
- Hilbert scheme

=== Category theory ===
- Grothendieck topology
- Topos
- Derived category
- Descent (category theory)
  - Grothendieck's Galois theory
- Algebraic stack
- Gerbe
- Étale cohomology
- Motive (algebraic geometry)
- Motivic cohomology
- A¹ homotopy theory
- Homotopical algebra

== Algebraic geometers ==
- Niels Henrik Abel
- Carl Gustav Jacob Jacobi
- Jakob Steiner
- Julius Plücker
- Arthur Cayley
- Bernhard Riemann
- Max Noether
- William Kingdon Clifford
- David Hilbert
- Italian school of algebraic geometry
  - Guido Castelnuovo
  - Federigo Enriques
  - Francesco Severi
- Solomon Lefschetz
- Oscar Zariski
- W. V. D. Hodge
- Sir Michael Atiyah
- Kunihiko Kodaira
- André Weil
- Jean-Pierre Serre
- Alexander Grothendieck
- Friedrich Hirzebruch
- Igor Shafarevich
- Heisuke Hironaka
- Shreeram S. Abhyankar
- Pierre Samuel
- C.P. Ramanujam
- David Mumford
- Michael Artin
- Phillip Griffiths
- Pierre Deligne
- Yuri Manin
- Shigefumi Mori
- Vladimir Drinfeld
- Vladimir Voevodsky
- Claire Voisin
- János Kollár
- Caucher Birkar
- Burt Totaro
- Patrick Brosnan
- Robin Hartshorne
- Joe Harris
