= Kodaira surface =

In mathematics, a Kodaira surface is a compact complex surface of Kodaira dimension 0 and odd first Betti number. The concept is named after Kunihiko Kodaira.

These are never algebraic, though they have non-constant meromorphic functions. They are usually divided into two subtypes: primary Kodaira surfaces with trivial canonical bundle, and secondary Kodaira surfaces which are quotients of these by finite groups of orders 2, 3, 4, or 6, and which have non-trivial canonical bundles. The secondary Kodaira surfaces have the same relation to primary ones that Enriques surfaces have to K3 surfaces, or bielliptic surfaces have to abelian surfaces.

Invariants: If the surface is the quotient of a primary Kodaira surface by a group of order k = 1,2,3,4,6, then the plurigenera P_{n} are 1 if n is divisible by k and 0 otherwise.

Hodge diamond:

		1
	1		2
1		2		1	(Primary)
	2		1
		1

		1
	0		1
0		0		0	(Secondary)
	1		0
		1

Examples: Take a non-trivial line bundle over an elliptic curve, remove the zero section, then quotient out the fibers by Z acting as multiplication by powers of some complex number z. This gives a primary Kodaira surface.
