= Algebraic surface =

Algebraic variety of dimension two

In mathematics, an algebraic surface is an algebraic variety of dimension two. Thus, an algebraic surface is a solution of a set of polynomial equations, in which there are two independent directions at every point. An example of an algebraic surface is the sphere, which is determined by the single polynomial equation $x^2+y^2+z^2=1.$ Studying the intrinsic geometry of algebraic surfaces is a central topic in algebraic geometry. The theory is much more complicated than for algebraic curves (one-dimensional cases), and was developed substantially by the Italian school of algebraic geometry in the late 19th and early 20th centuries. It remains an active field of research.

In the simplest cases, algebraic surfaces are studied as algebraic varieties over the complex numbers. For example, the familiar sphere (for real $x,y,z$), becomes a complex (affine) quadric surface, which simultaneously incorporates the sphere and hyperboloids of one and two sheets, and this allows some complications (such as the topology: whether the surface is connected, or simply connected) to be deferred somewhat. Higher degree surfaces include, for example, the Kummer surface. The classification of algebraic surfaces is much more intricate than the classification of algebraic curves, which have dimension one, and is already quite complicated.

Algebraic surfaces, like algebraic curves, may possess singularities, which are points where there is no tangent plane. A singularity may be a self-crossing point or a point where the number of "free" dimensions may drop, such as at a cusp. Catastrophe theory is strongly related with the classification of surface singularities. Likewise, algebraic surfaces may be defined over other fields than the complex numbers. This article focuses primarily on the complex case.

== Classification by the Kodaira dimension ==
In the case of dimension one, varieties are classified by only the topological genus, but, in dimension two, one needs to distinguish the arithmetic genus $p_a$ and the geometric genus $p_g$ because one cannot distinguish birationally only the topological genus. Then, irregularity is introduced for the classification of varieties. A summary of the results (in detail, for each kind of surface refers to each redirection), follows:

Examples of algebraic surfaces include (κ is the Kodaira dimension):

- κ = −∞: the projective plane, quadrics in P^{3}, cubic surfaces, Veronese surface, del Pezzo surfaces, ruled surfaces
- κ = 0 : K3 surfaces, abelian surfaces, Enriques surfaces, hyperelliptic surfaces
- κ = 1: elliptic surfaces
- κ = 2: surfaces of general type.

For more examples see the list of algebraic surfaces.

The first five examples are in fact birationally equivalent. That is, for example, a cubic surface has a function field isomorphic to that of the projective plane, being the rational functions in two indeterminates. The Cartesian product of two curves also provides examples.

== Birational geometry of surfaces ==
The birational geometry of algebraic surfaces is rich, because of blowing up (also known as a monoidal transformation), under which a point is replaced by the curve of all limiting tangent directions coming into it (a projective line). Certain curves may also be blown down, but there is a restriction (self-intersection number must be −1).

=== Castelnuovo's Theorem ===
One of the fundamental theorems for the birational geometry of surfaces is Castelnuovo's theorem. This states that any birational map between algebraic surfaces is given by a finite sequence of blowups and blowdowns.

== Properties ==
The Nakai criterion says that:

A Divisor D on a surface S is ample if and only if D^{2} > 0 and for all irreducible curve C on S D•C > 0.

Ample divisors have a nice property such as it is the pullback of some hyperplane bundle of projective space, whose properties are very well known. Let $\mathcal{D}(S)$ be the abelian group consisting of all the divisors on S. Then due to the intersection theorem

$$\mathcal{D}(S)\times\mathcal{D}(S)\rightarrow\mathbb{Z}:(X,Y)\mapsto X\cdot Y$$

is viewed as a quadratic form. Let

$$\mathcal{D}_0(S):=\{D\in\mathcal{D}(S)|D\cdot X=0,\text{for all } X\in\mathcal{D}(S)\}$$

then $\mathcal{D}/\mathcal{D}_0(S):=Num(S)$ becomes to be a numerical equivalent class group of S and

$$Num(S)\times Num(S)\mapsto\mathbb{Z}=(\bar{D},\bar{E})\mapsto D\cdot E$$

also becomes to be a quadratic form on $Num(S)$, where $\bar{D}$ is the image of a divisor D on S. (In the below the image $\bar{D}$ is abbreviated with D.)

For an ample line bundle H on S, the definition

$$\{H\}^\perp:=\{D\in Num(S)|D\cdot H=0\}.$$

is used in the surface version of the Hodge index theorem:

for $D\in\{\{H\}^\perp|D\ne0\}, D\cdot D < 0$, i.e. the restriction of the intersection form to $\{H\}^\perp$ is a negative definite quadratic form.

This theorem is proven using the Nakai criterion and the Riemann-Roch theorem for surfaces. The Hodge index theorem is used in Deligne's proof of the Weil conjecture.

Basic results on algebraic surfaces include the Hodge index theorem, and the division into five groups of birational equivalence classes called the classification of algebraic surfaces. The general type class, of Kodaira dimension 2, is very large (degree 5 or larger for a non-singular surface in P^{3} lies in it, for example).

There are essential three Hodge number invariants of a surface. Of those, h^{1,0} was classically called the irregularity and denoted by q; and h^{2,0} was called the geometric genus p_{g}. The third, h^{1,1}, is not a birational invariant, because blowing up can add whole curves, with classes in H^{1,1}. It is known that Hodge cycles are algebraic and that algebraic equivalence coincides with homological equivalence, so that h^{1,1} is an upper bound for ρ, the rank of the Néron-Severi group. The arithmetic genus p_{a} is the difference

geometric genus − irregularity.

This explains why the irregularity got its name, as a kind of 'error term'.

== Riemann-Roch theorem for surfaces ==
The Riemann-Roch theorem for surfaces was first formulated by Max Noether. The families of curves on surfaces can be classified, in a sense, and give rise to much of their interesting geometry.

== See also ==
- Minimal model program
