= Kodaira's classification =

In mathematics, Kodaira's classification is either

- The Enriques–Kodaira classification, a classification of complex surfaces, or
- Kodaira's classification of singular fibers, which classifies the possible fibers of an elliptic fibration.
