= Viacheslav V. Nikulin =

Russian mathematician

Viacheslav Nikulin
- Education: Moscow State University; Steklov Mathematical Institute
- Known for: Algebraic geometry
- Scientific career
- Fields: Mathematician
- Workplaces: University of Liverpool
- Doctoral advisor: Igor Shafarevich

Viacheslav Valentinovich Nikulin (Slava) is a Russian mathematician working in the algebraic geometry of K3 surfaces and Calabi–Yau threefolds, mirror symmetry, the arithmetic of quadratic forms, and hyperbolic Kac–Moody algebras. He is a professor of mathematics at the University of Liverpool. A third chair of mathematics was established for Nikulin in 1999, the second chair having been established in 1964 for C. T. C. Wall and the first having been established in 1882. Nikulin has made contributions towards the solution of Hilbert's 16th problem.

== Publications ==
- Nikulin, V. V.; Shafarevich, I. R. (1994), Geometries and Groups, Springer, ISBN 3-540-15281-4; translated from the Russian by M. Reid; first published in English in 1987
- Alexeev, V.; Nikulin, V. V. (2006), Del Pezzo and K3 Surfaces, The Mathematical Society of Japan, ISBN 4-931469-34-5
