= Contraction theorem =

In mathematics contraction theorem may refer to:

- The Banach contraction mapping theorem in functional analysis
- Castelnuovo's contraction theorem in algebraic geometry
