= K3 surface =

Type of smooth complex surface of kodaira dimension 0

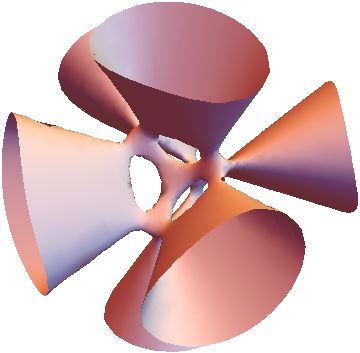
A smooth quartic surface in 3-space. The figure shows part of the real points (of real dimension 2) in a certain complex K3 surface (of complex dimension 2, hence real dimension 4).

Dans la seconde partie de mon rapport, il s'agit des variétés kählériennes dites K3, ainsi nommées en l'honneur de Kummer, Kähler, Kodaira et de la belle montagne K2 au Cachemire.

In the second part of my report, we deal with the Kähler varieties known as K3, named in honor of Kummer, Kähler, Kodaira and of the beautiful mountain K2 in Kashmir.

— André Weil (1958, p. 546), describing the reason for the name "K3 surface"

In mathematics, a complex analytic K3 surface is a compact connected complex manifold of dimension 2 with а trivial canonical bundle and irregularity zero. An (algebraic) K3 surface over any field means a smooth, proper, geometrically connected algebraic surface that satisfies the same conditions. In the Enriques–Kodaira classification of surfaces, K3 surfaces form one of the four classes of minimal surfaces of Kodaira dimension zero. A simple example is the Fermat quartic surface $x^4+y^4+z^4+w^4=0$ in complex projective 3-space.

Together with two-dimensional compact complex tori, K3 surfaces are the Calabi–Yau manifolds (and also the hyperkähler manifolds) of dimension two. As such, they are at the center of the classification of algebraic surfaces, between the positively curved del Pezzo surfaces (which are easy to classify) and the negatively curved surfaces of general type (which are essentially unclassifiable). K3 surfaces can be considered the simplest algebraic varieties whose structure does not reduce to curves or abelian varieties, and yet where a substantial understanding is possible. A complex K3 surface has real dimension 4, and it plays an important role in the study of smooth 4-manifolds. K3 surfaces have been applied to Kac–Moody algebras, mirror symmetry and string theory.

It can be useful to think of complex algebraic K3 surfaces as part of the broader family of complex analytic K3 surfaces. Many other types of algebraic varieties do not have such non-algebraic deformations.

== Definition ==
There are several equivalent ways to define K3 surfaces. The only compact complex surfaces with trivial canonical bundle are K3 surfaces and compact complex tori, and so one can add any condition excluding the latter to define K3 surfaces. For example, it is equivalent to define a complex analytic K3 surface as a simply connected compact complex manifold of dimension 2 with a nowhere-vanishing holomorphic 2-form. (The latter condition says exactly that the canonical bundle is trivial.)

There are also some variants of the definition. Over the complex numbers, some authors consider only the algebraic K3 surfaces. (An algebraic K3 surface is automatically projective.) Or one may allow K3 surfaces to have du Val singularities (the canonical singularities of dimension 2), rather than being smooth.

== Calculation of the Betti numbers ==
The Betti numbers of a complex analytic K3 surface are computed as follows. (A similar argument gives the same answer for the Betti numbers of an algebraic K3 surface over any field, defined using l-adic cohomology.) By definition, the canonical bundle $K_X = \Omega^2_X$ is trivial, and the irregularity q(X) (the dimension $h^1(X,O_X)$ of the coherent sheaf cohomology group $H^1(X,O_X)$) is zero. By Serre duality,

$$h^2(X,\mathcal{O}_X)=h^0(X,K_X)=1.$$

As a result, the arithmetic genus (or holomorphic Euler characteristic) of X is:

$$\chi(X,\mathcal{O}_X):=\sum_i (-1)^i h^i(X,\mathcal{O}_X)=1-0+1=2.$$

On the other hand, the Riemann–Roch theorem (Noether's formula) says:

$$\chi(X,\mathcal{O}_X) = \frac{1}{12} \left(c_1(X)^2+c_2(X)\right),$$

where $c_i(X)$ is the i-th Chern class of the tangent bundle. Since $K_X$ is trivial, its first Chern class $c_1(K_X)=-c_1(X)$ is zero, and so $c_2(X)=24$.

Next, the exponential sequence $0\to \Z_X\to O_X\to O_X^*\to 0$ gives an exact sequence of cohomology groups $0\to H^1(X,\Z) \to H^1(X,O_X)$, and so $H^1(X,\Z)=0$. Thus the Betti number $b_1(X)$ is zero, and by Poincaré duality, $b_3(X)$ is also zero. Finally, $c_2(X)=24$ is equal to the topological Euler characteristic

$$\chi(X)=\sum_i (-1)^ib_i(X).$$

Since $b_0(X)=b_4(X)=1$ and $b_1(X)=b_3(X)=0$, it follows that $b_2(X)=22$.

== Properties ==
- Any two complex analytic K3 surfaces are diffeomorphic as smooth 4-manifolds, by Kunihiko Kodaira.
- Every complex analytic K3 surface has a Kähler metric, by Yum-Tong Siu. (Analogously, but much easier: every algebraic K3 surface over a field is projective.) By Shing-Tung Yau's solution to the Calabi conjecture, it follows that every complex analytic K3 surface has a Ricci-flat Kähler metric.
- The Hodge numbers of any K3 surface are listed in the Hodge diamond:
  		1
  	0		0
  1		20		1
  	0		0
  		1
  One way to show this is to calculate the Jacobian ideal of a specific K3 surface, and then using a variation of Hodge structure on the moduli of algebraic K3 surfaces to show that all such K3 surfaces have the same Hodge numbers. A more low-brow calculation can be done using the calculation of the Betti numbers along with the parts of the Hodge structure computed on $H^2(X;\Z)$ for an arbitrary K3 surface. In this case, Hodge symmetry forces $H^0(X;\Omega_X^2)\cong \mathbb{C}$, hence $H^1(X,\Omega_X) \cong \mathbb{C}^{20}$. For K3 surfaces in characteristic p > 0, this was first shown by Alexey Rudakov and Igor Shafarevich.
- For a complex analytic K3 surface X, the intersection form (or cup product) on $H^2(X,\Z)\cong\Z^{22}$ is a symmetric bilinear form with values in the integers, known as the K3 lattice. This is isomorphic to the even unimodular lattice $\operatorname{II}_{3,19}$, or equivalently $E_8(-1)^{\oplus 2}\oplus U^{\oplus 3}$, where U is the hyperbolic lattice of rank 2 and $E_8$ is the E8 lattice.
- Yukio Matsumoto's 11/8 conjecture predicts that every smooth oriented 4-manifold X with even intersection form has second Betti number at least 11/8 times the absolute value of the signature. This would be optimal if true, since equality holds for a complex K3 surface, which has signature 3−19 = −16. The conjecture would imply that every simply connected smooth 4-manifold with even intersection form is homeomorphic to a connected sum of copies of the K3 surface and of $S^2\times S^2$.
- Every complex surface that is diffeomorphic to a K3 surface is a K3 surface, by Robert Friedman and John Morgan. On the other hand, there are smooth complex surfaces (some of them projective) that are homeomorphic but not diffeomorphic to a K3 surface, by Kodaira and Michael Freedman. These "homotopy K3 surfaces" all have Kodaira dimension 1.

== Examples ==
- The double cover X of the projective plane branched along a smooth sextic (degree 6) curve is a K3 surface of genus 2 (that is, degree 2g−2 = 2). (This terminology means that the inverse image in X of a general hyperplane in $\mathbf{P}^2$ is a smooth curve of genus 2.)
- A smooth quartic (degree 4) surface in $\mathbf{P}^3$ is a K3 surface of genus 3 (that is, degree 4).
- A Kummer surface is the quotient of a two-dimensional abelian variety A by the action $a\mapsto -a$. This results in 16 singularities, at the 2-torsion points of A. The minimal resolution of this singular surface may also be called a Kummer surface; that resolution is a K3 surface. When A is the Jacobian of a curve of genus 2, Kummer showed that the quotient $A/(\pm 1)$ can be embedded into $\mathbf{P}^3$ as a quartic surface with 16 nodes.
- More generally: for any quartic surface Y with du Val singularities, the minimal resolution of Y is an algebraic K3 surface.
- The intersection of a quadric and a cubic in $\mathbf{P}^4$ is a K3 surface of genus 4 (that is, degree 6).
- The intersection of three quadrics in $\mathbf{P}^5$ is a K3 surface of genus 5 (that is, degree 8).
- The complete intersection of two bihomogeneous forms of bidegrees $(1,2)$ and $(2,1)$ in $\mathbf{P}^2\times\mathbf{P}^2$ is a K3 surface, typically of Picard rank 2
- There are several databases of K3 surfaces with du Val singularities in weighted projective spaces.

== The Picard lattice ==
The Picard group Pic(X) of a complex analytic K3 surface X is the abelian group of complex analytic line bundles on X. For an algebraic K3 surface, Pic(X) is the group of algebraic line bundles on X. The two definitions agree for a complex algebraic K3 surface, by Jean-Pierre Serre's GAGA theorem.

The Picard group of a K3 surface X is always a finitely generated free abelian group; its rank is called the Picard number $\rho$. In the complex case, Pic(X) is a subgroup of $H^2(X,\Z)\cong\Z^{22}$. It is an important feature of K3 surfaces that many different Picard numbers can occur. For X a complex algebraic K3 surface, $\rho$ can be any integer between 1 and 20. In the complex analytic case, $\rho$ may also be zero. (In that case, X contains no closed complex curves at all. By contrast, an algebraic surface always contains many continuous families of curves.) Over an algebraically closed field of characteristic p > 0, there is a special class of K3 surfaces, supersingular K3 surfaces, with Picard number 22.

The Picard lattice of a K3 surface is the abelian group Pic(X) together with its intersection form, a symmetric bilinear form with values in the integers. (Over $\Complex$, the intersection form is the restriction of the intersection form on $H^2(X,\Z)$. Over a general field, the intersection form can be defined using the intersection theory of curves on a surface, by identifying the Picard group with the divisor class group.) The Picard lattice of a K3 surface is always even, meaning that the integer $u^2$ is even for each $u\in\operatorname{Pic}(X)$.

The Hodge index theorem implies that the Picard lattice of an algebraic K3 surface has signature $(1,\rho-1)$. Many properties of a K3 surface are determined by its Picard lattice, as a symmetric bilinear form over the integers. This leads to a strong connection between the theory of K3 surfaces and the arithmetic of symmetric bilinear forms. As a first example of this connection: a complex analytic K3 surface is algebraic if and only if there is an element $u\in\operatorname{Pic}(X)$ with $u^2>0$.

Roughly speaking, the space of all complex analytic K3 surfaces has complex dimension 20, while the space of K3 surfaces with Picard number $\rho$ has dimension $20-\rho$ (excluding the supersingular case). In particular, algebraic K3 surfaces occur in 19-dimensional families. More details about moduli spaces of K3 surfaces are given below.

The precise description of which lattices can occur as Picard lattices of K3 surfaces is complicated. One clear statement, due to Viacheslav Nikulin and David Morrison, is that every even lattice of signature $(1,\rho-1)$ with $\rho\leq 11$ is the Picard lattice of some complex projective K3 surface. The space of such surfaces has dimension $20-\rho$.

== Elliptic K3 surfaces ==
An important subclass of K3 surfaces, easier to analyze than the general case, consists of the K3 surfaces with an elliptic fibration $X\to\mathbf{P}^1$. "Elliptic" means that all but finitely many fibers of this morphism are smooth curves of genus 1. The singular fibers are unions of rational curves, with the possible types of singular fibers classified by Kodaira. There are always some singular fibers, since the sum of the topological Euler characteristics of the singular fibers is $\chi(X)=24$. A general elliptic K3 surface has exactly 24 singular fibers, each of type $I_1$ (a nodal cubic curve).

Whether a K3 surface is elliptic can be read from its Picard lattice. Namely, in characteristic not 2 or 3, a K3 surface X has an elliptic fibration if and only if there is a nonzero element $u\in\operatorname{Pic}(X)$ with $u^2=0$. (In characteristic 2 or 3, the latter condition may also correspond to a quasi-elliptic fibration.) It follows that having an elliptic fibration is a codimension-1 condition on a K3 surface. So there are 19-dimensional families of complex analytic K3 surfaces with an elliptic fibration, and 18-dimensional moduli spaces of projective K3 surfaces with an elliptic fibration.

Example: Every smooth quartic surface X in $\mathbf{P}^3$ that contains a line L has an elliptic fibration $X\to \mathbf{P}^1$, given by projecting away from L. The moduli space of all smooth quartic surfaces (up to isomorphism) has dimension 19, while the subspace of quartic surfaces containing a line has dimension 18.

== Rational curves on K3 surfaces ==
In contrast to positively curved varieties such as del Pezzo surfaces, a complex algebraic K3 surface X is not uniruled; that is, it is not covered by a continuous family of rational curves. On the other hand, in contrast to negatively curved varieties such as surfaces of general type, X contains a large discrete set of rational curves (possibly singular). In particular, Fedor Bogomolov and David Mumford showed that every curve on X is linearly equivalent to a positive linear combination of rational curves.

Another contrast to negatively curved varieties is that the Kobayashi metric on a complex analytic K3 surface X is identically zero. The proof uses that an algebraic K3 surface X is always covered by a continuous family of images of elliptic curves. (These curves are singular in X, unless X happens to be an elliptic K3 surface.) A stronger question that remains open is whether every complex K3 surface admits a nondegenerate holomorphic map from $\C^2$ (where "nondegenerate" means that the derivative of the map is an isomorphism at some point).

== The period map ==
Define a marking of a complex analytic K3 surface X to be an isomorphism of lattices from $H^2(X,\Z)$ to the K3 lattice $\Lambda=E_8(-1)^{\oplus 2}\oplus U^{\oplus 3}$. The space N of marked complex K3 surfaces is a non-Hausdorff complex manifold of dimension 20. The set of isomorphism classes of complex analytic K3 surfaces is the quotient of N by the orthogonal group $O(\Lambda)$, but this quotient is not a geometrically meaningful moduli space, because the action of $O(\Lambda)$ is far from being properly discontinuous. (For example, the space of smooth quartic surfaces is irreducible of dimension 19, and yet every complex analytic K3 surface in the 20-dimensional family N has arbitrarily small deformations which are isomorphic to smooth quartics.) For the same reason, there is not a meaningful moduli space of compact complex tori of dimension at least 2.

The period mapping sends a K3 surface to its Hodge structure. When stated carefully, the Torelli theorem holds: a K3 surface is determined by its Hodge structure. The period domain is defined as the 20-dimensional complex manifold

$$D=\{u\in P(\Lambda\otimes\Complex): u^2=0,\, u\cdot\overline{u} > 0\}.$$

The period mapping $N\to D$ sends a marked K3 surface X to the complex line $H^0(X,\Omega^2)\subset H^2(X,\Complex)\cong \Lambda\otimes\Complex$. This is surjective, and a local isomorphism, but not an isomorphism (in particular because D is Hausdorff and N is not). However, the global Torelli theorem for K3 surfaces says that the quotient map of sets

$$N/O(\Lambda)\to D/O(\Lambda)$$

is bijective. It follows that two complex analytic K3 surfaces X and Y are isomorphic if and only if there is a Hodge isometry from $H^2(X,\Z)$ to $H^2(Y,\Z)$, that is, an isomorphism of abelian groups that preserves the intersection form and sends $H^0(X,\Omega^2)\subset H^2(X,\Complex)$ to $H^0(Y,\Omega^2)$.

== Moduli spaces of projective K3 surfaces ==
A polarized K3 surface X of genus g is defined to be a projective K3 surface together with an ample line bundle L such that L is primitive (that is, not 2 or more times another line bundle) and $c_1(L)^2=2g-2$. This is also called a polarized K3 surface of degree 2g−2.

Under these assumptions, L is basepoint-free. In characteristic zero, Bertini's theorem implies that there is a smooth curve C in the linear system |L|. All such curves have genus g, which explains why (X,L) is said to have genus g.

The vector space of sections of L has dimension g + 1, and so L gives a morphism from X to projective space $\mathbf{P}^g$. In most cases, this morphism is an embedding, so that X is isomorphic to a surface of degree 2g−2 in $\mathbf{P}^g$.

There is an irreducible coarse moduli space $\mathcal{F}_g$ of polarized complex K3 surfaces of genus g for each $g\geq 2$; it can be viewed as a Zariski open subset of a Shimura variety for the group SO(2,19). For each g, $\mathcal{F}_g$ is a quasi-projective complex variety of dimension 19. Shigeru Mukai showed that this moduli space is unirational if $g\leq 13$ or $g=18,20$. In contrast, Valery Gritsenko, Klaus Hulek and Gregory Sankaran showed that $\mathcal{F}_g$ is of general type if $g\geq 63$ or $g=47,51,55,58,59,61$. A survey of this area was given by Voisin (2008).

The different 19-dimensional moduli spaces $\mathcal{F}_g$ overlap in an intricate way. Indeed, there is a countably infinite set of codimension-1 subvarieties of each $\mathcal{F}_g$ corresponding to K3 surfaces of Picard number at least 2. Those K3 surfaces have polarizations of infinitely many different degrees, not just 2g–2. So one can say that infinitely many of the other moduli spaces $\mathcal{F}_h$ meet $\mathcal{F}_g$. This is imprecise, since there is not a well-behaved space containing all the moduli spaces $\mathcal{F}_g$. However, a concrete version of this idea is the fact that any two complex algebraic K3 surfaces are deformation-equivalent through algebraic K3 surfaces.

More generally, a quasi-polarized K3 surface of genus g means a projective K3 surface with a primitive nef and big line bundle L such that $c_1(L)^2=2g-2$. Such a line bundle still gives a morphism to $\mathbf{P}^g$, but now it may contract finitely many (−2)-curves, so that the image Y of X is singular. (A (−2)-curve on a surface means a curve isomorphic to $\mathbf{P}^1$ with self-intersection −2.) The moduli space of quasi-polarized K3 surfaces of genus g is still irreducible of dimension 19 (containing the previous moduli space as an open subset). Formally, it works better to view this as a moduli space of K3 surfaces Y with du Val singularities.

== The ample cone and the cone of curves ==
A remarkable feature of algebraic K3 surfaces is that the Picard lattice determines many geometric properties of the surface, including the convex cone of ample divisors (up to automorphisms of the Picard lattice). The ample cone is determined by the Picard lattice as follows. By the Hodge index theorem, the intersection form on the real vector space $N^1(X):=\operatorname{Pic}(X)\otimes\R$ has signature $(1,\rho-1)$. It follows that the set of elements of $N^1(X)$ with positive self-intersection has two connected components. Call the positive cone the component that contains any ample divisor on X.

Case 1: There is no element u of Pic(X) with $u^2=-2$. Then the ample cone is equal to the positive cone. Thus it is the standard round cone.

Case 2: Otherwise, let $\Delta=\{u\in\operatorname{Pic}(X):u^2=-2\}$, the set of roots of the Picard lattice. The orthogonal complements of the roots form a set of hyperplanes which all go through the positive cone. Then the ample cone is a connected component of the complement of these hyperplanes in the positive cone. Any two such components are isomorphic via the orthogonal group of the lattice Pic(X), since that contains the reflection across each root hyperplane. In this sense, the Picard lattice determines the ample cone up to isomorphism.

A related statement, due to Sándor Kovács, is that knowing one ample divisor A in Pic(X) determines the whole cone of curves of X. Namely, suppose that X has Picard number $\rho\geq 3$. If the set of roots $\Delta$ is empty, then the closed cone of curves is the closure of the positive cone. Otherwise, the closed cone of curves is the closed convex cone spanned by all elements $u\in\Delta$ with $A\cdot u>0$. In the first case, X contains no (−2)-curves; in the second case, the closed cone of curves is the closed convex cone spanned by all (−2)-curves. (If $\rho=2$, there is one other possibility: the cone of curves may be spanned by one (−2)-curve and one curve with self-intersection 0.) So the cone of curves is either the standard round cone, or else it has "sharp corners" (because every (−2)-curve spans an isolated extremal ray of the cone of curves).

== Automorphism group ==
K3 surfaces are somewhat unusual among algebraic varieties in that their automorphism groups may be infinite, discrete, and highly nonabelian. By a version of the Torelli theorem, the Picard lattice of a complex algebraic K3 surface X determines the automorphism group of X up to commensurability. Namely, let the Weyl group W be the subgroup of the orthogonal group O(Pic(X)) generated by reflections in the set of roots $\Delta$. Then W is a normal subgroup of O(Pic(X)), and the automorphism group of X is commensurable with the quotient group O(Pic(X))/W. A related statement, due to Hans Sterk, is that Aut(X) acts on the nef cone of X with a rational polyhedral fundamental domain.

== Relation to string duality ==
K3 surfaces appear almost ubiquitously in string duality and provide an important tool for the understanding of it. String compactifications on these surfaces are not trivial, yet they are simple enough to analyze most of their properties in detail. The type IIA string, the type IIB string, the E_{8}×E_{8} heterotic string, the Spin(32)/Z2 heterotic string, and M-theory are related by compactification on a K3 surface. For example, the Type IIA string compactified on a K3 surface is equivalent to the heterotic string compactified on a 4-torus (Aspinwall (1996)).

== History ==
Quartic surfaces in $\mathbf{P}^3$ were studied by Ernst Kummer, Arthur Cayley, Friedrich Schur and other 19th-century geometers. More generally, Federigo Enriques observed in 1893 that for various numbers g, there are surfaces of degree 2g−2 in $\mathbf{P}^g$ with trivial canonical bundle and irregularity zero. In 1909, Enriques showed that such surfaces exist for all $g\geq 3$, and Francesco Severi showed that the moduli space of such surfaces has dimension 19 for each g.

André Weil (1958) gave K3 surfaces their name (see the quotation above) and made several influential conjectures about their classification. Kunihiko Kodaira completed the basic theory around 1960, in particular making the first systematic study of complex analytic K3 surfaces which are not algebraic. He showed that any two complex analytic K3 surfaces are deformation-equivalent and hence diffeomorphic, which was new even for algebraic K3 surfaces. An important later advance was the proof of the Torelli theorem for complex algebraic K3 surfaces by Ilya Piatetski-Shapiro and Igor Shafarevich (1971), extended to complex analytic K3 surfaces by Daniel Burns and Michael Rapoport (1975).

== See also ==
- Enriques surface
- Tate conjecture
- Mathieu moonshine, a mysterious relationship between K3 surfaces and the Mathieu group M24.
