= Normal degree =

In algebraic geometry, the normal degree of a rational curve C on a surface is defined to be –K.C–2 where K is the canonical divisor of the surface.
