= James A. Morrow =

American mathematician

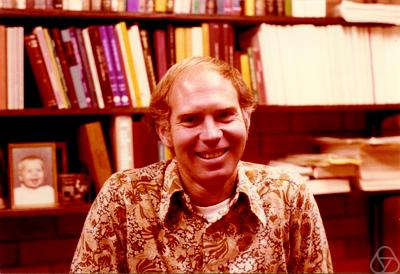
- James Morrow in Seattle, WA, in 1977
- Born: September 14, 1941; Little Rock, Arkansas
- Died: April 2, 2024 (aged 82); Seattle, Washington
- Citizenship: United States
- Education: California Institute of Technology (B.S.); Stanford University (Ph.D.)
- Known for: Differential geometry,
- Awards: Fellow of Association for Women in Mathematics (AWM); AWM Humphreys Award; MAA Distinguished Teaching Award; MAA Haimo Award; PIMS Education Prize
- Scientific career
- Fields: Mathematics
- Workplaces: University of Washington
- Thesis: The Topological Type of Non-Singular Deformations of Singular Surfaces (1967)
- Doctoral advisor: Kunihiko Kodaira
- Website: math.washington.edu/people/james-morrow

James Allen Morrow (September 14, 1941 – April 2, 2024) was an American mathematician. His research interests shifted from several complex variables and differential geometry to discrete inverse problems in the middle of his career.

== Education and career ==
Morrow was born in Little Rock, Arkansas and attended high school in Dallas, Texas. In 1963, Morrow received a B.S. degree from California Institute of Technology (Caltech) in Pasadena, California. In 1967, Morrow received his Ph.D. in mathematics from Stanford University in Palo Alto, California. His dissertation "The Topological Type of Non-Singular Deformations of Singular Surfaces" was written under the supervision of Kunihiko Kodaira. After teaching at the University of California, Berkeley for two years, Morrow joined the faculty of the University of Washington in Seattle, Washington as an assistant professor in 1969. He was promoted to associate professor in 1973 and to professor in 1978.

== Honors and awards ==
In 2005, Morrow received the Pacific Institute for the Mathematical Sciences (PIMS) Education Prize, which recognizes mathematicians who have "played a major role in encouraging activities which enhance public awareness and appreciation of mathematics, as well as fostering communication amongst the various groups and organizations concerned". In that same year he was awarded a University of Washington College on Arts and Sciences Alumni Distinguished Professor.

In 2006, Morrow received the Mathematical Association of America (MAA) Distinguished Teaching Award of the Pacific Northwest Section of the MAA.

In 2008, Morrow received one of the Deborah and Franklin Haimo Awards for Distinguished College or University Teaching of Mathematics from the Mathematical Association of America.

In 2013, Morrow received the Association for Women in Mathematics (AWM) M. Gweneth Humphreys Award for Mentorship of Undergraduate Women for his "outstanding achievements in inspiring undergraduate women to discover and pursue their passion for mathematics."

In 2018, Morrow was elected a Fellow of the Association for Women in Mathematics in the inaugural class.

== Book ==
- James Morrow and Kunihiko Kodaira, Complex manifolds , AMS Chelsea Publishing, Providence, RI, 1971 (reprinted in 2006), Electronic ISBN 978-1-4704-3031-3.
