= Potential good reduction =

In mathematics, potential good reduction is a property of the reduction modulo a prime or, more generally, prime ideal, of an algebraic variety.

== Definitions ==
"Good reduction" refers to the reduced variety having the same properties as the original, for example, an algebraic curve having the same genus, or a smooth variety remaining smooth. "Potential good reduction" refers to the situation over a sufficiently large finite extension of the field of definition.

== Equivalent formulations ==
For elliptic curves, potential good reduction is equivalent to the j-invariant being an algebraic integer.

== See also ==
- Elliptic surface
