= Kodaira dimension =

Concept in algebraic geometry

In algebraic geometry, the Kodaira dimension κ(X) measures the size of the canonical model of a projective variety X.

Soviet mathematician Igor Shafarevich in a seminar introduced an important numerical invariant of surfaces with the notation κ. Japanese mathematician Shigeru Iitaka extended it and defined the Kodaira dimension for higher dimensional varieties (under the name of canonical dimension), and later named it after Kunihiko Kodaira.

== The plurigenera ==
The canonical bundle of a smooth algebraic variety X of dimension n over a field is the line bundle of n-forms,

$$\,\!K_X = \bigwedge^n\Omega^1_X,$$

which is the nth exterior power of the cotangent bundle of X. For an integer d, the dth tensor power of K_{X} is again a line bundle. For d ≥ 0, the vector space of global sections $H^0(X, K_X^d)$ has the remarkable property that it is a birational invariant of smooth projective varieties X. That is, this vector space is canonically identified with the corresponding space for any smooth projective variety which is isomorphic to X outside lower-dimensional subsets.

For d ≥ 0, the dth plurigenus of X is defined as the dimension of the vector space of global sections of $K_X^d$:

$$P_d = h^0(X, K_X^d) = \dim H^0(X, K_X^d).$$

The plurigenera are important birational invariants of an algebraic variety. In particular, the simplest way to prove that a variety is not rational (that is, not birational to projective space) is to show that some plurigenus P_{d} with d > 0 is not zero. If the space of sections of $K_X^d$ is nonzero, then there is a natural rational map from X to the projective space

$$\mathbf{P}(H^0(X, K_X^d)) = \mathbf{P}^{P_d - 1},$$

called the d-canonical map. The canonical ring R(K_{X}) of a variety X is the graded ring

$$R(K_X) :=\bigoplus_{d\geq 0} H^0(X,K_X^d).$$

Also see geometric genus and arithmetic genus.

The Kodaira dimension of X is defined to be $-\infty$ if the plurigenera P_{d} are zero for all d > 0; otherwise, it is the minimum κ such that P_{d} /d^{κ} is bounded. The Kodaira dimension of an n-dimensional variety is either $-\infty$ or an integer in the range from 0 to n.

=== Interpretations of the Kodaira dimension ===
The following integers are equal if they are non-negative. A good reference is Lazarsfeld (2004), Theorem 2.1.33.

- The dimension of the Proj construction $\operatorname{Proj} R (K_X)$, a projective variety called the canonical model of X depending only on the birational equivalence class of X. (This is defined only if the canonical ring $R = R(K_X)$ is finitely generated, which is true in characteristic zero and conjectured in general.)
- The dimension of the image of the d-canonical mapping for all positive multiples d of some positive integer $d_0$.
- The transcendence degree of the fraction field of R, minus one; i.e. $t-1$, where t is the number of algebraically independent generators one can find.
- The rate of growth of the plurigenera: that is, the smallest number κ such that $P_d/d^{\kappa}$ is bounded. In Big O notation, it is the minimal κ such that $P_d = O(d^{\kappa})$.

When one of these numbers is undefined or negative, then all of them are. In this case, the Kodaira dimension is said to be negative or to be $-\infty$. Some historical references define it to be −1, but then the formula $\kappa(X\times Y) = \kappa(X) + \kappa(Y)$ does not always hold, and the statement of the Iitaka conjecture becomes more complicated. For example, the Kodaira dimension of $\mathbf{P}^1\times X$ is $-\infty$ for all varieties X.

=== Application ===
The Kodaira dimension gives a useful rough division of all algebraic varieties into several classes.

Varieties with low Kodaira dimension can be considered special, while varieties of maximal Kodaira dimension are said to be of general type.

Geometrically, there is a very rough correspondence between Kodaira dimension and curvature: negative Kodaira dimension corresponds to positive curvature, zero Kodaira dimension corresponds to flatness, and maximum Kodaira dimension (general type) corresponds to negative curvature.

The specialness of varieties of low Kodaira dimension is analogous to the specialness of Riemannian manifolds of positive curvature (and general type corresponds to the genericity of non-positive curvature); see classical theorems, especially on Pinched sectional curvature and Positive curvature.

These statements are made more precise below.

=== Dimension 1 ===
Smooth projective curves are discretely classified by genus, which can be any natural number g = 0, 1, ....

Here "discretely classified" means that for a given genus, there is an irreducible moduli space of curves of that genus.

The Kodaira dimension of a curve X is:

- κ = $-\infty$: genus 0 (the projective line P^{1}): K_{X} is not effective, P_{d} = 0 for all d > 0.
- κ = 0: genus 1 (elliptic curves): K_{X} is a trivial bundle, P_{d} = 1 for all d ≥ 0.
- κ = 1: genus g ≥ 2: K_{X} is ample, P_{d} = (2d − 1)(g − 1) for all d ≥ 2.

Compare with the Uniformization theorem for surfaces (real surfaces, since a complex curve has real dimension 2): Kodaira dimension $-\infty$ corresponds to positive curvature, Kodaira dimension 0 corresponds to flatness, Kodaira dimension 1 corresponds to negative curvature. Note that most algebraic curves are of general type: in the moduli space of curves, two connected components correspond to curves not of general type, while all the other components correspond to curves of general type. Further, the space of curves of genus 0 is a point, the space of curves of genus 1 has (complex) dimension 1, and the space of curves of genus g ≥ 2 has dimension 3g − 3.

the classification table of algebraic curves
Kodaira dimension κ(C)
Kodaira dimension κ(C)	genus of C : g(C)	structure
$1$	$\ge 2$	curve of general type
$0$	$1$	elliptic curve
$-\infty$	$0$	the projective line $\mathbb{P}^1$

=== Dimension 2 ===
The Enriques–Kodaira classification classifies algebraic surfaces: coarsely by Kodaira dimension, then in more detail within a given Kodaira dimension. To give some simple examples: the product P^{1} × X has Kodaira dimension $-\infty$ for any curve X; the product of two curves of genus 1 (an abelian surface) has Kodaira dimension 0; the product of a curve of genus 1 with a curve of genus at least 2 (an elliptic surface) has Kodaira dimension 1; and the product of two curves of genus at least 2 has Kodaira dimension 2 and hence is of general type.

the classification table of algebraic surfaces
Kodaira dimension κ(C)
Kodaira dimension κ(C)	geometric genus p_{g}	irregularity q	structure
$2$			surface of general type
$1$			elliptic surface
$0$	$1$	$2$	abelian surface
$0$	$0$	$1$	hyperelliptic surface
$0$	$1$	$0$	K3 surface
$0$	$0$	$0$	Enriques surface
$-\infty$	$0$	$\ge1$	ruled surface
$-\infty$	$0$	$0$	rational surface

For a surface X of general type, the image of the d-canonical map is birational to X if d ≥ 5.

=== Any dimension ===
Rational varieties (varieties birational to projective space) have Kodaira dimension $-\infty$. Abelian varieties (the compact complex tori that are projective) have Kodaira dimension zero. More generally, Calabi–Yau manifolds (in dimension 1, elliptic curves; in dimension 2, abelian surfaces, K3 surfaces, and quotients of those varieties by finite groups) have Kodaira dimension zero (corresponding to admitting Ricci flat metrics).

Any variety in characteristic zero that is covered by rational curves (nonconstant maps from P^{1}), called a uniruled variety, has Kodaira dimension −∞. Conversely, the main conjectures of minimal model theory (notably the abundance conjecture) would imply that every variety of Kodaira dimension −∞ is uniruled. This converse is known for varieties of dimension at most 3.

Siu (2002) proved the invariance of plurigenera under deformations for all smooth complex projective varieties. In particular, the Kodaira dimension does not change when the complex structure of the manifold is changed continuously.

the classification table of algebraic three-folds
Kodaira dimension κ(C)
Kodaira dimension κ(C)	geometric genus p_{g}	irregularity q	examples
$3$			three-fold of general type
$2$			fibration over a surface with general fiber an elliptic curve
$1$			fibration over a curve with general fiber a surface with κ = 0
$0$	$1$	$3$	abelian variety
$0$	$0$	$2$	fiber bundle over an abelian surface whose fibers are elliptic curves
$0$	$0$ or $1$	$1$	fiber bundle over an elliptic curve whose fibers are surfaces with κ = 0
$0$	$0$ or $1$	$0$	Calabi–Yau 3-fold
$-\infty$	$0$	$\ge1$	uniruled 3-folds
$-\infty$	$0$	$0$	rational 3-folds, Fano 3-folds, and others

A fibration of normal projective varieties X → Y means a surjective morphism with connected fibers.

For a 3-fold X of general type, the image of the d-canonical map is birational to X if d ≥ 61.

== General type ==
A variety of general type X is one of maximal Kodaira dimension (Kodaira dimension equal to its dimension):

$$\kappa(X) = \dim X.$$

Equivalent conditions are that the line bundle $K_X$ is big, or that the d-canonical map is generically injective (that is, a birational map to its image) for d sufficiently large.

For example, a variety with ample canonical bundle is of general type.

In some sense, most algebraic varieties are of general type. For example, a smooth hypersurface of degree d in the n-dimensional projective space is of general type if and only if $d > n+1$. In that sense, most smooth hypersurfaces in projective space are of general type.

Varieties of general type seem too complicated to classify explicitly, even for surfaces. Nonetheless, there are some strong positive results about varieties of general type. For example, Enrico Bombieri showed in 1973 that the d-canonical map of any complex surface of general type is birational for every $d\ge 5$. More generally, Christopher Hacon and James McKernan, Shigeharu Takayama, and Hajime Tsuji showed in 2006 that for every positive integer n, there is a constant $c(n)$ such that the d-canonical map of any complex n-dimensional variety of general type is birational when $d\ge c(n)$.

The birational automorphism group of a variety of general type is finite.

== Application to classification ==
Let X be a variety of nonnegative Kodaira dimension over a field of characteristic zero, and let B be the canonical model of X, B = Proj R(X, K_{X}); the dimension of B is equal to the Kodaira dimension of X. There is a natural rational map X – → B; any morphism obtained from it by blowing up X and B is called the Iitaka fibration. The minimal model and abundance conjectures would imply that the general fiber of the Iitaka fibration can be arranged to be a Calabi–Yau variety, which in particular has Kodaira dimension zero. Moreover, there is an effective Q-divisor Δ on B (not unique) such that the pair (B, Δ) is klt, K_{B} + Δ is ample, and the canonical ring of X is the same as the canonical ring of (B, Δ) in degrees a multiple of some d > 0. In this sense, X is decomposed into a family of varieties of Kodaira dimension zero over a base (B, Δ) of general type. (Note that the variety B by itself need not be of general type. For example, there are surfaces of Kodaira dimension 1 for which the Iitaka fibration is an elliptic fibration over P^{1}.)

Given the conjectures mentioned, the classification of algebraic varieties would largely reduce to the cases of Kodaira dimension $-\infty$, 0 and general type. For Kodaira dimension $-\infty$ and 0, there are some approaches to classification. The minimal model and abundance conjectures would imply that every variety of Kodaira dimension $-\infty$ is uniruled, and it is known that every uniruled variety in characteristic zero is birational to a Fano fiber space. The minimal model and abundance conjectures would imply that every variety of Kodaira dimension 0 is birational to a Calabi-Yau variety with terminal singularities.

The Iitaka conjecture states that the Kodaira dimension of a fibration is at least the sum of the Kodaira dimension of the base and the Kodaira dimension of a general fiber; see Mori (1987) for a survey. The Iitaka conjecture helped to inspire the development of minimal model theory in the 1970s and 1980s. It is now known in many cases, and would follow in general from the minimal model and abundance conjectures.

== The relationship to Moishezon manifolds ==
Nakamura and Ueno proved the following additivity formula for complex manifolds (Ueno (1975)). Although the base space is not required to be algebraic, the assumption that all the fibers are isomorphic is very special. Even with this assumption, the formula can fail when the fiber is not Moishezon.

Let π: V → W be an analytic fiber bundle of compact complex manifolds, meaning that π is locally a product (and so all fibers are isomorphic as complex manifolds). Suppose that the fiber F is a Moishezon manifold. Then
$$\kappa(V)=\kappa(F)+\kappa(W).$$

== See also ==
- List of complex and algebraic surfaces
- Enriques-Kodaira classification
- Bogomolov–Sommese vanishing theorem
