= Shigeru Iitaka =

Japanese mathematician

- Born: May 29, 1942; Chiba, Japan
- Education: University of Tokyo
- Known for: Kodaira dimension, Iitaka dimension
- Awards: Iyanaga Prize (1980); Japan Academy Prize (1990)
- Scientific career
- Fields: Mathematics
- Workplaces: Gakushuin University
- Doctoral advisor: Kunihiko Kodaira
- Doctoral students: Yujiro Kawamata

Shigeru Iitaka (飯高 茂 Iitaka Shigeru, born May 29, 1942, Chiba) is a Japanese mathematician at Gakushuin University working in algebraic geometry who introduced the Kodaira dimension, and Iitaka dimension. He was a world leader in the field of Algebraic geometry.

He received his Ph.D. in 1970 from the University of Tokyo under Kunihiko Kodaira with thesis「代数多様体のD-次元について」(On D-dimensions of algebraic varieties). He was awarded the Iyanaga Prize of the Mathematical Society of Japan in 1980 and the Japan Academy Prize in 1990.
