= Enriques–Kodaira classification =

Mathematical classification of surfaces

In mathematics, the Enriques–Kodaira classification groups compact complex surfaces into ten classes, each parametrized by a moduli space. For most of the classes the moduli spaces are well understood, but for the class of surfaces of general type the moduli spaces seem too complicated to describe explicitly, though some components are known.

Max Noether began the systematic study of algebraic surfaces, and Guido Castelnuovo proved important parts of the classification. Federigo Enriques described the classification of complex projective surfaces. Kunihiko Kodaira later extended the classification to include non-algebraic compact surfaces.

== Statement of the classification ==
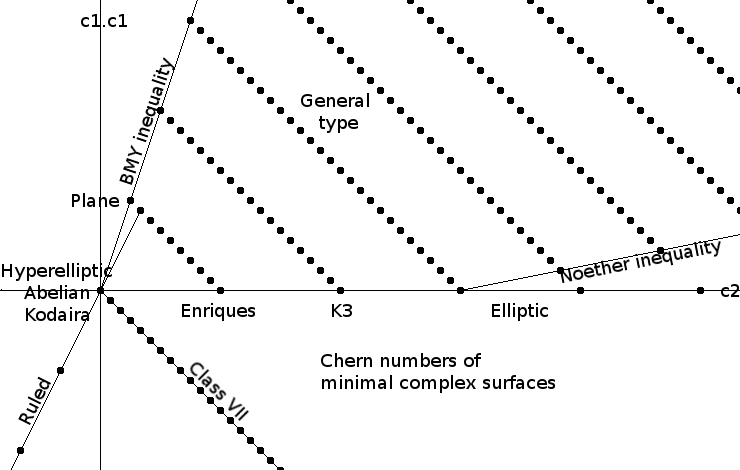
Chern numbers of minimal complex surfaces

The Enriques–Kodaira classification of compact complex surfaces states that every nonsingular minimal compact complex surface is of exactly one of the 10 types listed on this page. The classification and its relation with the Kodaira dimension is summarized in the following table :

Kodaira-Enriques classification of surfaces
Kodaira dimension	Surfaces (link to section below)	Surfaces (link to main article)
$-\infty$	Rational surfaces; Ruled surfaces of positive genus; Surfaces of class VII	Rational surfaces; Ruled surfaces of positive genus; Surfaces of class VII
0	K3 surfaces; Tori; Kodaira surfaces; Enriques surfaces; Hyperelliptic surfaces	K3 surfaces; Tori; Kodaira surfaces; Enriques surfaces; Hyperelliptic surfaces
1	Elliptic surfaces (Note: Does not hold in characteristic 2 and 3, where there exists quasi-elliptic surfaces of Kodaira dimension 1.)	Elliptic surfaces
2	Surfaces of general type	Surfaces of general type

For the 9 classes of surfaces other than general type, there is a fairly complete description of what all the surfaces look like (which for class VII depends on the global spherical shell conjecture, still unproved in 2024). For surfaces of general type not much is known about their explicit classification, though many examples have been found.

== Invariants of surfaces ==
=== Hodge numbers and Kodaira dimension ===
The most important invariants of a compact complex surfaces used in the classification can be given in terms of the dimensions of various coherent sheaf cohomology groups. The basic ones are the plurigenera and the Hodge numbers defined as follows:

- K is the canonical line bundle whose sections are the holomorphic 2-forms.
- $P_n = \dim H^0(K^n), n \geqslant 1$ are called the plurigenera. They are birational invariants, i.e., invariant under blowing up. Using Seiberg–Witten theory, Robert Friedman and John Morgan showed that for complex manifolds they only depend on the underlying oriented smooth 4-manifold. For non-Kähler surfaces the plurigenera are determined by the fundamental group, but for Kähler surfaces there are examples of surfaces that are homeomorphic but have different plurigenera and Kodaira dimensions. The individual plurigenera are not often used; the most important thing about them is their growth rate, measured by the Kodaira dimension.
- $\kappa$ is the Kodaira dimension: it is $-\infty$ (sometimes written −1) if the plurigenera are all 0, and is otherwise the smallest number (0, 1, or 2 for surfaces) such that $P_n/n^{\kappa}$ is bounded. Enriques did not use this definition: instead he used the values of $P_{12}$ and $K \cdot K = c_1^2$. These determine the Kodaira dimension given the following correspondence:

$$\begin{align}
\kappa = -\infty &\longleftrightarrow P_{12} = 0 \\
\kappa = 0 &\longleftrightarrow P_{12} = 1 \\
\kappa = 1 &\longleftrightarrow P_{12} > 1 \text{ and } K\cdot K = 0 \\
\kappa = 2 &\longleftrightarrow P_{12} > 1 \text{ and } K\cdot K > 0 \\
\end{align}$$

- $h^{i,j} = \dim H^j(X, \Omega^i),$ where $\Omega^i$ is the sheaf of holomorphic i-forms, are the Hodge numbers, often arranged in the Hodge diamond:

$$\begin{matrix}
& & h^{0,0} & & \\
& h^{1,0} & & h^{0,1} & \\
h^{2,0} & & h^{1,1} & & h^{0,2}\\
& h^{2,1} & & h^{1,2} & \\
& & h^{2,2} & & \\
\end{matrix}$$

By Serre duality $h^{i,j} = h^{2-i,2-j}$ and $h^{0,0} =h^{2,2} =1.$ The Hodge numbers of a complex surface depend only on the oriented real cohomology ring of the surface, and are invariant under birational transformations except for $h^{1,1}$ which increases by 1 under blowing up a single point.
- If the surface is Kähler then $h^{i,j} = h^{j,i}$ and there are only three independent Hodge numbers.
- If the surface is compact then $h^{1,0}$ equals $h^{0,1}$ or $h^{0,1}-1.$

=== Invariants related to Hodge numbers ===
There are many invariants that (at least for complex surfaces) can be written as linear combinations of the Hodge numbers, as follows:

- Betti numbers: defined by $b_i = \dim H^i(S), 0 \leqslant i \leqslant 4.$

$$\begin{cases} b_0 = b_4 = 1 \\ b_1 = b_3 = h^{1,0} +h^{0,1} = h^{2,1} + h^{1,2} \\ b_2 = h^{2,0} + h^{1,1} + h^{0,2} \end{cases}$$

In characteristic p > 0 the Betti numbers are defined using l-adic cohomology and need not satisfy these relations.

- Euler characteristic or Euler number:

$$e=b_0-b_1+b_2-b_3+b_4.$$

- The irregularity is defined as the dimension of the Picard variety and the Albanese variety and denoted by q. For complex surfaces (but not always for surfaces of prime characteristic)

$$q= h^{0,1}.$$

- The geometric genus:

$$p_g = h^{0,2} = h^{2,0} = P_1.$$

- The arithmetic genus:

$$p_a = p_g - q = h^{0,2} - h^{0,1}.$$

- The holomorphic Euler characteristic of the trivial bundle (usually differs from the Euler number e defined above):

$$\chi = p_g - q +1 = h^{0,2} -h^{0,1} +1.$$

By Noether's formula it is also equal to the Todd genus $\tfrac{1}{12}(c_1^2 +c_2).$

- The signature of the second cohomology group for complex surfaces is denoted by $\tau$:

$$\tau = 4\chi - e = \sum\nolimits_{i,j}(-1)^j h^{i,j}.$$

- $b^{\pm}$are the dimensions of the maximal positive and negative definite subspaces of $H^2,$ so:

$$\begin{cases} b^+ + b^- = b_2 \\ b^+-b^- = \tau \end{cases}$$

- c_{2} = e and $c_1^2 = K^2 = 12\chi - e$ are the Chern numbers, defined as the integrals of various polynomials in the Chern classes over the manifold.

=== Other invariants ===
There are further invariants of compact complex surfaces that are not used so much in the classification. These include algebraic invariants such as the Picard group Pic(X) of divisors modulo linear equivalence, its quotient the Néron–Severi group NS(X) with rank the Picard number ρ, topological invariants such as the fundamental group π_{1} and the integral homology and cohomology groups, and invariants of the underlying smooth 4-manifold such as the Seiberg–Witten invariants and Donaldson invariants.

== Minimal models and blowing up ==
Any surface is birational to a non-singular surface, so for most purposes it is enough to classify the non-singular surfaces.

Given any point on a surface, we can form a new surface by blowing up this point, which means roughly that we replace it by a copy of the projective line. For the purpose of this article, a non-singular surface X is called minimal if it cannot be obtained from another non-singular surface by blowing up a point. By Castelnuovo's contraction theorem, this is equivalent to saying that X has no (−1)-curves (smooth rational curves with self-intersection number −1). (In the more modern terminology of the minimal model program, a smooth projective surface X would be called minimal if its canonical line bundle K_{X} is nef. A smooth projective surface has a minimal model in that stronger sense if and only if its Kodaira dimension is nonnegative.)

Every surface X is birational to a minimal non-singular surface, and this minimal non-singular surface is unique if X has Kodaira dimension at least 0 or is not algebraic. Algebraic surfaces of Kodaira dimension $-\infty$ may be birational to more than one minimal non-singular surface, but it is easy to describe the relation between these minimal surfaces. For example, P^{1} × P^{1} blown up at a point is isomorphic to P^{2} blown up twice. So to classify all compact complex surfaces up to birational isomorphism it is (more or less) enough to classify the minimal non-singular ones.

== Surfaces of Kodaira dimension −∞ ==
Algebraic surfaces of Kodaira dimension $-\infty$ can be classified as follows. If q > 0 then the map to the Albanese variety has fibers that are projective lines (if the surface is minimal) so the surface is a ruled surface. If q = 0 this argument does not work as the Albanese variety is a point, but in this case Castelnuovo's theorem implies that the surface is rational.

For non-algebraic surfaces Kodaira found an extra class of surfaces, called type VII, which are still not well understood.

=== Rational surfaces ===
Rational surface means surface birational to the complex projective plane P^{2}. These are all algebraic. The minimal rational surfaces are P^{2} itself and the Hirzebruch surfaces Σ_{n} for n = 0 or n ≥ 2. (The Hirzebruch surface Σ_{n} is the P^{1} bundle over P^{1} associated to the sheaf O(0) + O(n). The surface Σ_{0} is isomorphic to P^{1} × P^{1}, and Σ_{1} is isomorphic to P^{2} blown up at a point so is not minimal.)

Invariants: The plurigenera are all 0 and the fundamental group is trivial.

Hodge diamond:

		1
	0		0
0		1		0	(Projective plane)
	0		0
		1

		1
	0		0
0		2		0	(Hirzebruch surfaces)
	0		0
		1

Examples: P^{2}, P^{1} × P^{1} = Σ_{0}, Hirzebruch surfaces Σ_{n}, quadrics, cubic surfaces, del Pezzo surfaces, Veronese surface. Many of these examples are non-minimal.

=== Ruled surfaces of genus > 0 ===
Ruled surfaces of genus g have a smooth morphism to a curve of genus g whose fibers are lines P^{1}. They are all algebraic. (The ones of genus 0 are the Hirzebruch surfaces and are rational.) Any ruled surface is birationally equivalent to P^{1} × C for a unique curve C, so the classification of ruled surfaces up to birational equivalence is essentially the same as the classification of curves. A ruled surface not isomorphic to P^{1} × P^{1} has a unique ruling (P^{1} × P^{1} has two).

Invariants: The plurigenera are all 0.

Hodge diamond:

		1
	g		g
0		2		0
	g		g
		1

Examples: The product of any curve of genus > 0 with P^{1}.

=== Surfaces of class VII ===
These surfaces are never algebraic or Kähler. The minimal ones with b_{2} = 0 have been classified by Bogomolov, and are either Hopf surfaces or Inoue surfaces. Examples with positive second Betti number include Inoue-Hirzebruch surfaces, Enoki surfaces, and more generally Kato surfaces. The global spherical shell conjecture implies that all minimal class VII surfaces with positive second Betti number are Kato surfaces, which would more or less complete the classification of the type VII surfaces.

Invariants: q = 1, h^{1,0} = 0. All plurigenera are 0.

Hodge diamond:

		1
	0		1
0		b_{2}		0
	1		0
		1

== Surfaces of Kodaira dimension 0 ==
These surfaces are classified by starting with Noether's formula $12\chi = c_2 + c_1^2.$ For Kodaira dimension 0, K has zero intersection number with itself, so $c_1^2 = 0.$ Using

$$\begin{align}
\chi &= h^{0,0} - h^{0,1} +h^{0,2} \\
c_2  &= 2 - 2b_1 +b_2
\end{align}$$

we arrive at:

$$10+12h^{0,2} = 8 h^{0,1} + 2 \left (2h^{0,1} - b_1 \right )+ b_2$$

Moreover since κ = 0 we have:

$$h^{0,2} = \begin{cases} 1 & K = 0 \\ 0 & \text{otherwise} \end{cases}$$

combining this with the previous equation gives:

$$8 h^{0,1} + 2 \left (2h^{0,1} - b_1 \right )+ b_2  = \begin{cases} 22 & K = 0 \\ 10 & \text{otherwise} \end{cases}$$

In general 2h^{0,1} ≥ b_{1}, so three terms on the left are non-negative integers and there are only a few solutions to this equation.

- For algebraic surfaces 2h^{0,1} − b_{1} is an even integer between 0 and 2p_{g}.
- For compact complex surfaces 2h^{0,1} − b_{1} = 0 or 1.
- For Kähler surfaces 2h^{0,1} − b_{1} = 0 and h^{1,0} = h^{0,1}.

Most solutions to these conditions correspond to classes of surfaces, as in the following table:

b_{2}	b_{1}	h^{0,1}	p_{g} = h^{0,2}	h^{1,0}	h^{1,1}	Surfaces	Fields
22	0	0	1	0	20	K3	Any. Always Kähler over the complex numbers, but need not be algebraic.
10	0	0	0	0	10	Classical Enriques	Any. Always algebraic.
10	0	1	1			Non-classical Enriques	Only characteristic 2
6	4	2	1	2	4	Abelian surfaces, tori	Any. Always Kähler over the complex numbers, but need not be algebraic.
2	2	1	0	1	2	Hyperelliptic	Any. Always algebraic
2	2	1 or 2	0 or 1			Quasi-hyperelliptic	Only characteristics 2, 3
4	3	2	1	1	2	Primary Kodaira	Only complex, never Kähler
0	1	1	0	0	0	Secondary Kodaira	Only complex, never Kähler

=== K3 surfaces ===
These are the minimal compact complex surfaces of Kodaira dimension 0 with q = 0 and trivial canonical line bundle. They are all Kähler manifolds. All K3 surfaces are diffeomorphic, and their diffeomorphism class is an important example of a smooth spin simply connected 4-manifold.

Invariants: The second cohomology group H^{2}(X, Z) is isomorphic to the unique even unimodular lattice II_{3,19} of dimension 22 and signature −16.

Hodge diamond:

		1
	0		0
1		20		1
	0		0
		1

Examples:

- Degree 4 hypersurfaces in P^{3}(C)
- Kummer surfaces. These are obtained by quotienting out an abelian surface by the automorphism a → −a, then blowing up the 16 singular points.

A marked K3 surface is a K3 surface together with an isomorphism from II_{3,19} to H^{2}(X, Z). The moduli space of marked K3 surfaces is connected non-Hausdorff smooth analytic space of dimension 20. The algebraic K3 surfaces form a countable collection of 19-dimensional subvarieties of it.

=== Abelian surfaces and 2-dimensional complex tori ===
The two-dimensional complex tori include the abelian surfaces. One-dimensional complex tori are just elliptic curves and are all algebraic, but Riemann discovered that most complex tori of dimension 2 are not algebraic. The algebraic ones are exactly the 2-dimensional abelian varieties. Most of their theory is a special case of the theory of higher-dimensional tori or abelian varieties. Criteria to be a product of two elliptic curves (up to isogeny) were a popular study in the nineteenth century.

Invariants: The plurigenera are all 1. The surface is diffeomorphic to S^{1} × S^{1} × S^{1} × S^{1} so the fundamental group is Z^{4}.

Hodge diamond:

		1
	2		2
1		4		1
	2		2
		1

Examples: A product of two elliptic curves. The Jacobian of a genus 2 curve. Any quotient of C^{2} by a lattice.

=== Kodaira surfaces ===
These are never algebraic, though they have non-constant meromorphic functions. They are usually divided into two subtypes: primary Kodaira surfaces with trivial canonical bundle, and secondary Kodaira surfaces which are quotients of these by finite groups of orders 2, 3, 4, or 6, and which have non-trivial canonical bundles. The secondary Kodaira surfaces have the same relation to primary ones that Enriques surfaces have to K3 surfaces, or bielliptic surfaces have to abelian surfaces.

Invariants: If the surface is the quotient of a primary Kodaira surface by a group of order k = 1, 2, 3, 4, 6, then the plurigenera P_{n} are 1 if n is divisible by k and 0 otherwise.

Hodge diamond:

		1
	1		2
1		2		1	(Primary)
	2		1
		1

		1
	0		1
0		0		0	(Secondary)
	1		0
		1

Examples: Take a non-trivial line bundle over an elliptic curve, remove the zero section, then quotient out the fibers by Z acting as multiplication by powers of some complex number z. This gives a primary Kodaira surface.

=== Enriques surfaces ===
These are the complex surfaces such that q = 0 and the canonical line bundle is non-trivial, but has trivial square. Enriques surfaces are all algebraic (and therefore Kähler). They are quotients of K3 surfaces by a group of order 2 and their theory is similar to that of algebraic K3 surfaces.

Invariants: The plurigenera P_{n} are 1 if n is even and 0 if n is odd. The fundamental group has order 2. The second cohomology group H^{2}(X, Z) is isomorphic to the sum of the unique even unimodular lattice II_{1,9} of dimension 10 and signature −8 and a group of order 2.

Hodge diamond:

		1
	0		0
0		10		0
	0		0
		1

Marked Enriques surfaces form a connected 10-dimensional family, which has been described explicitly.

In characteristic 2 there are some extra families of Enriques surfaces called singular and supersingular Enriques surfaces; see the article on Enriques surfaces for details.

=== Hyperelliptic (or bielliptic) surfaces ===
Over the complex numbers these are quotients of a product of two elliptic curves by a finite group of automorphisms. The finite group can be Z/2Z, Z/2Z + Z/2Z, Z/3Z, Z/3Z + Z/3Z, Z/4Z, Z/4Z + Z/2Z, or Z/6Z, giving seven families of such surfaces.

Hodge diamond:

		1
	1		1
0		2		0
	1		1
		1

Over fields of characteristics 2 or 3 there are some extra families given by taking quotients by a non-etale group scheme; see the article on hyperelliptic surfaces for details.

== Surfaces of Kodaira dimension 1 ==
An elliptic surface is a surface equipped with an elliptic fibration (a surjective holomorphic map to a curve B such that all but finitely many fibers are smooth irreducible curves of genus 1). The generic fiber in such a fibration is a genus 1 curve over the function field of B. Conversely, given a genus 1 curve over the function field of a curve, its relative minimal model is an elliptic surface. Kodaira and others have given a fairly complete description of all elliptic surfaces. In particular, Kodaira gave a complete list of the possible singular fibers. The theory of elliptic surfaces is analogous to the theory of proper regular models of elliptic curves over discrete valuation rings (e.g., the ring of p-adic integers) and Dedekind domains (e.g., the ring of integers of a number field).

In finite characteristic 2 and 3 one can also get quasi-elliptic surfaces, whose fibers may almost all be rational curves with a single node, which are "degenerate elliptic curves".

Every surface of Kodaira dimension 1 is an elliptic surface (or a quasielliptic surface in characteristics 2 or 3), but the converse is not true: an elliptic surface can have Kodaira dimension $-\infty$, 0, or 1. All Enriques surfaces, all hyperelliptic surfaces, all Kodaira surfaces, some K3 surfaces, some abelian surfaces, and some rational surfaces are elliptic surfaces, and these examples have Kodaira dimension less than 1. An elliptic surface whose base curve B is of genus at least 2 always has Kodaira dimension 1, but the Kodaira dimension can be 1 also for some elliptic surfaces with B of genus 0 or 1.

Invariants: $c_1^2 =0, c_2\geqslant 0.$

Example: If E is an elliptic curve and B is a curve of genus at least 2, then E×B is an elliptic surface of Kodaira dimension 1.

== Surfaces of Kodaira dimension 2 (surfaces of general type) ==
These are all algebraic, and in some sense most surfaces are in this class. Gieseker showed that there is a coarse moduli scheme for surfaces of general type; this means that for any fixed values of the Chern numbers c^{2}_{1} and c_{2}, there is a quasi-projective scheme classifying the surfaces of general type with those Chern numbers. However it is a very difficult problem to describe these schemes explicitly, and there are very few pairs of Chern numbers for which this has been done (except when the scheme is empty!)

Invariants: There are several conditions that the Chern numbers of a minimal complex surface of general type must satisfy:

- $c_1^2, c_2>0$
- $c_1^2 \leqslant 3c_2$ (the Bogomolov–Miyaoka–Yau inequality)
- $5c_1^2 - c_2 + 36 \geqslant 0$ (the Noether inequality)
- $c_1^2 + c_2 \equiv 0 \bmod 12.$

Most pairs of integers satisfying these conditions are the Chern numbers for some complex surface of general type.

Examples: The simplest examples are the product of two curves of genus at least 2, and a hypersurface of degree at least 5 in P^{3}. There are a large number of other constructions known. However, there is no known construction that can produce "typical" surfaces of general type for large Chern numbers; in fact it is not even known if there is any reasonable concept of a "typical" surface of general type. There are many other examples that have been found, including most Hilbert modular surfaces, fake projective planes, Barlow surfaces, and so on.

== Classification in positive characteristic ==
The classification in positive characteristic was begun by David Mumford (1969) and completed by Enrico Bombieri and David Mumford (1976, 1977). It is similar to that of algebraic surfaces in characteristic 0, but there are no Kodaira surfaces or surfaces of type VII. There are some extra families in small characteristic.

The final answer turns out to be essentially the same as the answer in the complex case (though the methods employed are sometimes quite different), once two significant adjustments are made. The first is that one may get "non-classical" surfaces, which come about when p-torsion in the Picard scheme degenerates to a non-reduced group scheme. The second is the possibility of obtaining quasi-elliptic surfaces in characteristics two and three. These are surfaces fibred over a curve where the general fibre is a curve of arithmetic genus one with a cusp.

Once these adjustments are made, the surfaces are divided into four classes by their Kodaira dimension, as in the complex case. There are Enriques surfaces in characteristic 2, and hyperelliptic surfaces in characteristics 2 and 3, and in Kodaira dimension 1 in characteristics 2 and 3 one also allows quasielliptic fibrations. These extra families can be understood as follows: In characteristic 0 these surfaces are the quotients of surfaces by finite groups, but in finite characteristics it is also possible to take quotients by finite group schemes that are not étale. One gets both singular and supersingular Enriques surfaces in characteristic 2, and quasi-hyperelliptic surfaces in characteristics 2 and 3.

Oscar Zariski constructed some surfaces in positive characteristic that are unirational but not rational, derived from inseparable extensions (so-called Zariski surfaces). In positive characteristic Serre showed that $h^0(\Omega)$ may differ from $h^1(\mathcal{O})$, and Igusa showed that even when they are equal they may be greater than the irregularity (the dimension of the Picard variety).

== See also ==
- List of algebraic surfaces
