= Birational invariant =

Property in algebraic geometry

In algebraic geometry, a birational invariant is a property that is preserved under birational equivalence.

== Formal definition ==
A birational invariant is a quantity or object that is well-defined on a birational equivalence class of algebraic varieties. In other words, it depends only on the function field of the variety.

== Examples ==
The first example is given by the grounding work of Riemann himself: in his thesis, he shows that one can define a Riemann surface to each algebraic curve; every Riemann surface comes from an algebraic curve, well defined up to birational equivalence and two birational equivalent curves give the same surface. Therefore, the Riemann surface, or more simply its Geometric genus is a birational invariant.

A more complicated example is given by Hodge theory: in the case of an algebraic surface, the Hodge numbers h^{0,1} and h^{0,2} of a non-singular projective complex surface are birational invariants. The Hodge number h^{1,1} is not, since the process of blowing up a point to a curve on the surface can augment it.
