= Castelnuovo's contraction theorem =

Constructs the minimal model of a given smooth algebraic surface

In mathematics, Castelnuovo's contraction theorem, named after Guido Castelnuovo, is used in the classification theory of algebraic surfaces to construct the minimal model of a given smooth algebraic surface.

More precisely, if $X$ is a smooth projective surface over $\C$ and $C$ a (−1)-curve on $X$ (which means a smooth rational curve of self-intersection number −1), then there exists a morphism from $X$ to another smooth projective surface $Y$ such that the curve $C$ has been contracted to one point $P$, and moreover this morphism is an isomorphism outside $C$; that is, $X\setminus C$ is isomorphic to $Y\setminus P$.

This contraction morphism is sometimes called a blowdown, which is the inverse operation of blowup. The curve $C$ is also called an exceptional curve of the first kind.
