= Spaltenstein variety =

Variety in algebraic geometry

In algebraic geometry, a Spaltenstein variety is a variety given by the fixed point set of a nilpotent transformation on a flag variety. They were introduced by Nicolas Spaltenstein (1976, 1982). In the special case of full flag varieties the Spaltenstein varieties are Springer varieties.
