= Kenji Ueno =

Japanese mathematician

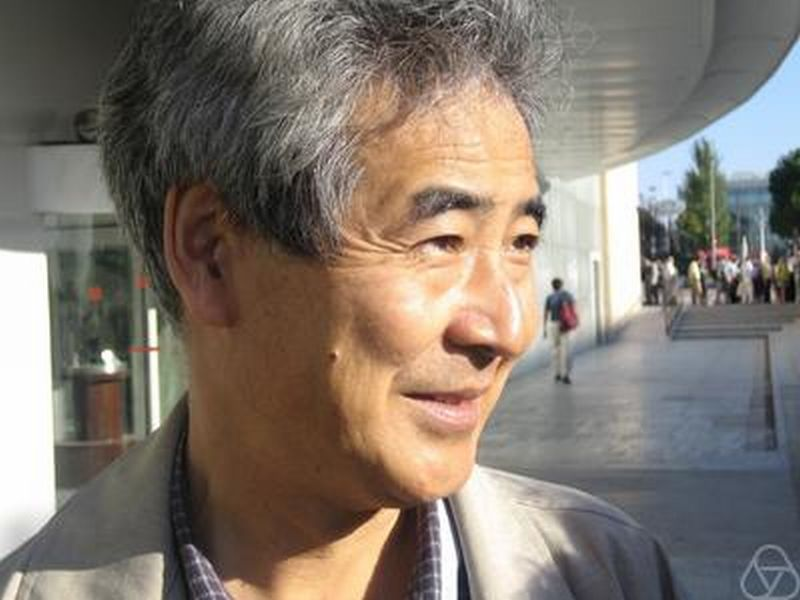
Kenji Ueno, Madrid 2006

Kenji Ueno (上野 健爾, Ueno Kenji, 1945, Kumamoto Prefecture) is a Japanese mathematician, specializing in algebraic geometry.

He was in the 1970s at the University of Tokyo and was from 1987 to 2009 a professor at the University of Kyoto and is now the director of Yokkaichi University's Seki Kōwa Institute for Mathematics. In 1978 he was an Invited Speaker (Classification of algebraic manifolds) at the International Congress of Mathematicians in Helsinki.

Ueno was a visiting professor at several universities, including the University of Bonn and the University of Mannheim in the 1970s.

He is the author and editor of several books on algebraic geometry.

== Selected publications ==
- Algebraic Geometry, 3 volumes, American Mathematical Society 1999, 2002, 2003 (Vol. 1 From Algebraic Varieties to Schemes, Vol. 2 Sheaves and Cohomology, Vol. 3 Further Studies of Schemes)
- Conformal Field Theory with Gauge Symmetry. American Mathematical Society. 2008.
- with Koji Shiga, Shigeyuki Morita: A Mathematical Gift: the interplay between topology, functions, geometry and algebra. Vol. 1 & 2. American Mathematical Society. 2003; based on lectures in Kyoto, 1996 — Volume 2
- with Yuji Shimizu: Advances in Moduli Theory. American Mathematical Society. 2001. ISBN 9780821821565.
- Ueno, Kenji (1975). Classification theory of algebraic varieties and compact complex manifolds. Lecture Notes in Mathematics 439. Vol. 439. Springer Verlag. doi:10.1007/BFb0070570. ISBN 978-3-540-07138-9; based on lectures in Mannheim, 1972
- with Yukihiko Namikawa: Namikawa, Yukihiko; Ueno, Kenji (1972). "On geometrical classification of fibers in pencils of curves of genus two". Proc. Japan Acad. 48 (6): 373–376. doi:10.3792/pja/1195519625. MR 0319996.
- "Classification of algebraic varieties, I" (PDF). Compositio Math. 27: 277–342. 1973.
- Ueno, Kenji (1978). "On algebraic fiber spaces of abelian varieties". Mathematische Annalen. 237: 1–22. doi:10.1007/bf01351555. S2CID 120564737.
- with Joergen Andersen: Andersen, Jørgen Ellegaard; Ueno, Kenji (2007). "Geometric construction of modular functors from conformal field theory". Journal of Knot Theory and Its Ramifications. 16 (2): 127–202. arXiv:math/0306235. doi:10.1142/s0218216507005233. S2CID 11891378.
