= Geometrically (algebraic geometry) =

In algebraic geometry, especially in scheme theory, a property is said to hold geometrically over a field if it also holds over the algebraic closure of the field. In other words, a property holds geometrically if it holds after a base change to a geometric point. For example, a smooth variety is a variety that is geometrically regular.

== Geometrically irreducible and geometrically reduced ==
Given a scheme X that is of finite type over a field k, the following are equivalent:

- X is geometrically irreducible; i.e., $X \times_k \overline{k} = X \times_{\operatorname{Spec} k} {\operatorname{Spec} \overline{k}}$ is irreducible, where $\overline{k}$ denotes an algebraic closure of k.
- $X \times_k k_s$ is irreducible for a separable closure $k_s$ of k.
- $X \times_k F$ is irreducible for each field extension F of k.

The same statement also holds if "irreducible" is replaced with "reduced" and the separable closure is replaced by the perfect closure.

== Sources ==
- Hartshorne, Robin (1977), Algebraic Geometry, Graduate Texts in Mathematics, vol. 52, New York: Springer-Verlag, ISBN 978-0-387-90244-9, MR 0463157
