= Hyperelliptic surface =

In mathematics, a hyperelliptic surface, or bi-elliptic surface, is a minimal surface whose Albanese morphism is an elliptic fibration without singular fibres. Any such surface can be written as the quotient of a product of two elliptic curves by a finite abelian group. Hyperelliptic surfaces form one of the classes of surfaces of Kodaira dimension 0 in the Enriques–Kodaira classification.

== Invariants ==
The Kodaira dimension is 0.

Hodge diamond:

		1
	1		1
0		2		0
	1		1
		1

== Classification ==
Any hyperelliptic surface is a quotient (E×F)/G, where E = C/Λ and F are elliptic curves, and G is a subgroup of F (acting on F by translations), which acts on E not only by translations. There are seven families of hyperelliptic surfaces as in the following table.

order of K	Λ	G	Action of G on E
2	Any	Z/2Z	e → −e
2	Any	Z/2Z ⊕ Z/2Z	e → −e, e → e+c, −c=c
3	Z ⊕ Zω	Z/3Z	e → ωe
3	Z ⊕ Zω	Z/3Z ⊕ Z/3Z	e → ωe, e → e+c, ωc=c
4	Z ⊕ Zi;	Z/4Z	e → ie
4	Z ⊕ Zi	Z/4Z ⊕ Z/2Z	e → ie, e → e+c, ic=c
6	Z ⊕ Zω	Z/6Z	e → −ωe

Here ω is a primitive cube root of 1 and i is a primitive 4th root of 1.

== Quasi hyperelliptic surfaces ==
A quasi-hyperelliptic surface is a surface whose canonical divisor is numerically equivalent to zero, the Albanese mapping maps to an elliptic curve, and all its fibers are rational with a cusp. They only exist in characteristics 2 or 3. Their second Betti number is 2, the second Chern number vanishes, and the holomorphic Euler characteristic vanishes. They were classified by (Bombieri & Mumford 1976), who found six cases in characteristic 3 (in which case 6K= 0) and eight in characteristic 2 (in which case 6K or 4K vanishes). Any quasi-hyperelliptic surface is a quotient (E×F)/G, where E is a rational curve with one cusp, F is an elliptic curve, and G is a finite subgroup scheme of F (acting on F by translations).
