= Hodge cycle =

Kind of homology class in differential geometry

In differential geometry, a Hodge cycle or Hodge class is a particular kind of homology class defined on a complex algebraic variety V, or more generally on a Kähler manifold. A homology class x in a homology group

$$H_k(V, \Complex) = H$$

where V is a non-singular complex algebraic variety or Kähler manifold is a Hodge cycle, provided it satisfies two conditions. Firstly, k is an even integer $2p$, and in the direct sum decomposition of H shown to exist in Hodge theory, x is purely of type $(p,p)$. Secondly, x is a rational class, in the sense that it lies in the image of the abelian group homomorphism

$$H_k(V, \Q) \to H$$

defined in algebraic topology (as a special case of the universal coefficient theorem). The conventional term Hodge cycle therefore is slightly inaccurate, in that x is considered as a class (modulo boundaries); but this is normal usage.

The importance of Hodge cycles lies primarily in the Hodge conjecture, to the effect that Hodge cycles should always be algebraic cycles, for V a complete algebraic variety. This is an unsolved problem, one of the Millennium Prize Problems. It is known that being a Hodge cycle is a necessary condition to be an algebraic cycle that is rational, and numerous particular cases of the conjecture are known.
