= Canonical bundle =

Concept in algebraic geometry

In mathematics, the canonical bundle of a non-singular algebraic variety $V$ of dimension $n$ over a field is the line bundle $\,\!\Omega^n = \omega$, which is the $n$th exterior power of the cotangent bundle $\Omega$ on $V$.

Over the complex numbers, it is the determinant bundle of the holomorphic cotangent bundle $T^*V$. Equivalently, it is the line bundle of holomorphic $n$-forms on $V$. This is the dualising object for Serre duality on $V$. It may equally well be considered as an invertible sheaf.

The canonical class is the divisor class of a Cartier divisor $K$ on $V$ giving rise to the canonical bundle — it is an equivalence class for linear equivalence on $V$, and any divisor in it may be called a canonical divisor. An anticanonical divisor is any divisor −$K$ with $K$ canonical.

The anticanonical bundle is the corresponding inverse bundle $\omega^{-1}$. When the anticanonical bundle of $V$ is ample, $V$ is called a Fano variety.

== The adjunction formula ==
Suppose that $X$ is a smooth variety and that $D$ is a smooth divisor on $X$. The adjunction formula relates the canonical bundles of $X$ and $D$. It is a natural isomorphism

$$\omega_D = i^*(\omega_X \otimes \mathcal{O}(D)).$$

In terms of canonical classes, it is

$$K_D = (K_X + D)|_D.$$

This formula is one of the most powerful formulas in algebraic geometry. An important tool of modern birational geometry is inversion of adjunction, which allows one to deduce results about the singularities of $X$ from the singularities of $D$.

== The canonical bundle formula ==
Let $X$ be a normal surface. A genus $g$ fibration $f:X\to B$ of $X$ is a proper flat morphism $f$ to a smooth curve such that $f_*\mathcal{O}_X\cong \mathcal{O}_B$ and all fibers of $f$ have arithmetic genus $g$. If $X$ is a smooth projective surface and the fibers of $f$ do not contain rational curves of self-intersection $-1$, then the fibration is called minimal. For example, if $X$ admits a (minimal) genus 0 fibration, then is $X$ is birationally ruled, that is, birational to $\mathbb{P}^1\times B$.

For a minimal genus 1 fibration (also called elliptic fibrations) $f:X\to B$ all but finitely many fibers of $f$ are geometrically integral and all fibers are geometrically connected (by Zariski's connectedness theorem). In particular, for a fiber $F=\sum^{n}_{i=1}a_iE_i$ of $f$, we have that $F.E_i=K_X.E_i=0,$ where $K_X$ is a canonical divisor of $X$; so if $\operatorname{gcd}(a_i)=1$, $F$ is geometrically integral and a multiple fiber otherwise.

Consider a minimal genus 1 fibration $f:X\to B$. Let $F_1,\dots,F_r$ be the finitely many fibers that are not geometrically integral and write $F_i=m_iF_i^'$ where $m_i>1$ is greatest common divisor of coefficients of the expansion of $F_i$ into integral components; these are called multiple fibers. By cohomology and base change one has that $R^1f_*\mathcal{O}_X=\mathcal{L}\oplus\mathcal{T}$ where $\mathcal{L}$ is an invertible sheaf and $\mathcal{T}$ is a torsion sheaf ($\mathcal{T}$ is supported on $b\in B$ such that $h^0(X_b,\mathcal{O}_{X_b})>1$). Then, one has that

$$\omega_X\cong f^*(\mathcal{L}^{-1}\otimes \omega_{B})\otimes \mathcal{O}_X\left(\sum^r_{i=1}a_iF_i'\right)$$

where $0\leq a_i<m_i$ for each $i$ and $\operatorname{deg}\left(\mathcal{L}^{-1}\right)=\chi(\mathcal{O}_X)+\operatorname{length}(\mathcal{T})$. One notes that

$$\operatorname{length}(\mathcal{T})=0\iff a_i=m_i-1$$.

For example, for the minimal genus 1 fibration of a (quasi)-bielliptic surface induced by the Albanese morphism, the canonical bundle formula gives that this fibration has no multiple fibers. A similar deduction can be made for any minimal genus 1 fibration of a K3 surface. On the other hand, a minimal genus one fibration of an Enriques surface will always admit multiple fibers and so, such a surface will not admit a section.

== Singular case ==
On a singular variety $X$, there are several ways to define the canonical divisor. If the variety is normal, it is smooth in codimension one. In particular, we can define canonical divisor on the smooth locus. This gives us a unique Weil divisor class on $X$. It is this class, denoted by $K_X$ that is referred to as the canonical divisor on $X.$

Alternately, again on a normal variety $X$, one can consider $h^{-d}(\omega^._X)$, the $-d$'th cohomology of the normalized dualizing complex of $X$. This sheaf corresponds to a Weil divisor class, which is equal to the divisor class $K_X$ defined above. In the absence of the normality hypothesis, the same result holds if $X$ is S2 and Gorenstein in dimension one.

== Canonical maps ==
If the canonical class is effective, then it determines a rational map from V into projective space. This map is called the canonical map. The rational map determined by the nth multiple of the canonical class is the n-canonical map. The n-canonical map sends V into a projective space of dimension one less than the dimension of the global sections of the nth multiple of the canonical class. n-canonical maps may have base points, meaning that they are not defined everywhere (i.e., they may not be a morphism of varieties). They may have positive dimensional fibers, and even if they have zero-dimensional fibers, they need not be local analytic isomorphisms.

=== Canonical curves ===
The best studied case is that of projective curves. Here, the canonical bundle is the same as the (holomorphic) cotangent bundle. A global section of the canonical bundle is therefore the same as an everywhere-regular differential form. Classically, these were called differentials of the first kind. The degree of the canonical class is 2g − 2 for a curve of genus g.

==== Low genus ====
Suppose that C is a smooth algebraic curve of genus g. If g is zero, then C is P^{1}, and the canonical class is the class of −2P, where P is any point of C. This follows from the calculus formula d(1/t) = −dt/t^{2}, for example, a meromorphic differential with double pole at the origin on the Riemann sphere. In particular, K_{C} and its multiples are not effective. If g is one, then C is an elliptic curve, and K_{C} is the trivial bundle. The global sections of the trivial bundle form a one-dimensional vector space, so the n-canonical map for any n is the map to a point.

==== Hyperelliptic case ====
If C has genus two or more, then the canonical class is big, so the image of any n-canonical map is a curve. The image of the 1-canonical map is called a canonical curve. A canonical curve of genus g always sits in a projective space of dimension g − 1. When C is a hyperelliptic curve, the canonical curve is a rational normal curve, and C a double cover of its canonical curve. For example if P is a polynomial of degree 6 (without repeated roots) then

y^{2} = P(x)

is an affine curve representation of a genus 2 curve, necessarily hyperelliptic, and a basis of the differentials of the first kind is given in the same notation by

dx/√P(x), x dx/√P(x).

This means that the canonical map is given by homogeneous coordinates [1: x] as a morphism to the projective line. The rational normal curve for higher genus hyperelliptic curves arises in the same way with higher power monomials in x.

==== General case ====
Otherwise, for non-hyperelliptic C which means g is at least 3, the morphism is an isomorphism of C with its image, which has degree 2g − 2. Thus for g = 3 the canonical curves (non-hyperelliptic case) are quartic plane curves. All non-singular plane quartics arise in this way. There is explicit information for the case g = 4, when a canonical curve is an intersection of a quadric and a cubic surface; and for g = 5 when it is an intersection of three quadrics. There is a converse, which is a corollary to the Riemann–Roch theorem: a non-singular curve C of genus g embedded in projective space of dimension g − 1 as a linearly normal curve of degree 2g − 2 is a canonical curve, provided its linear span is the whole space. In fact the relationship between canonical curves C (in the non-hyperelliptic case of g at least 3), Riemann-Roch, and the theory of special divisors is rather close. Effective divisors D on C consisting of distinct points have a linear span in the canonical embedding with dimension directly related to that of the linear system in which they move; and with some more discussion this applies also to the case of points with multiplicities.

More refined information is available, for larger values of g, but in these cases canonical curves are not generally complete intersections, and the description requires more consideration of commutative algebra. The field started with Max Noether's theorem: the dimension of the space of quadrics passing through C as embedded as canonical curve is (g − 2)(g − 3)/2. Petri's theorem, often cited under this name and published in 1923 by Karl Petri (1881–1955), states that for g at least 4 the homogeneous ideal defining the canonical curve is generated by its elements of degree 2, except for the cases of (a) trigonal curves and (b) non-singular plane quintics when g = 6. In the exceptional cases, the ideal is generated by the elements of degrees 2 and 3. Historically speaking, this result was largely known before Petri, and has been called the theorem of Babbage-Chisini-Enriques (for Dennis Babbage who completed the proof, Oscar Chisini and Federigo Enriques). The terminology is confused, since the result is also called the Noether–Enriques theorem. Outside the hyperelliptic cases, Noether proved that (in modern language) the canonical bundle is normally generated: the symmetric powers of the space of sections of the canonical bundle map onto the sections of its tensor powers. This implies for instance the generation of the quadratic differentials on such curves by the differentials of the first kind; and this has consequences for the local Torelli theorem. Petri's work actually provided explicit quadratic and cubic generators of the ideal, showing that apart from the exceptions the cubics could be expressed in terms of the quadratics. In the exceptional cases the intersection of the quadrics through the canonical curve is respectively a ruled surface and a Veronese surface.

These classical results were proved over the complex numbers, but modern discussion shows that the techniques work over fields of any characteristic.

=== Canonical rings ===
The canonical ring of V is the graded ring

$$R = \bigoplus_{d = 0}^\infty H^0(V, K_V^d).$$

If the canonical class of V is an ample line bundle, then the canonical ring is the homogeneous coordinate ring of the image of the canonical map. This can be true even when the canonical class of V is not ample. For instance, if V is a hyperelliptic curve, then the canonical ring is again the homogeneous coordinate ring of the image of the canonical map. In general, if the ring above is finitely generated, then it is elementary to see that it is the homogeneous coordinate ring of the image of a k-canonical map, where k is any sufficiently divisible positive integer.

The minimal model program proposed that the canonical ring of every smooth or mildly singular projective variety was finitely generated. In particular, this was known to imply the existence of a canonical model, a particular birational model of V with mild singularities that could be constructed by blowing down V. When the canonical ring is finitely generated, the canonical model is Proj of the canonical ring. If the canonical ring is not finitely generated, then Proj R is not a variety, and so it cannot be birational to V; in particular, V admits no canonical model. One can show that if the canonical divisor K of V is a nef divisor and the self intersection of K is greater than zero, then V will admit a canonical model (more generally, this is true for normal complete Gorenstein algebraic spaces).

A fundamental theorem of Birkar–Cascini–Hacon–McKernan from 2006 is that the canonical ring of a smooth or mildly singular projective algebraic variety is finitely generated.

The Kodaira dimension of V is the dimension of the canonical ring minus one. Here the dimension of the canonical ring may be taken to mean Krull dimension or transcendence degree.

== See also ==
- Birational geometry
- Differential form
