= Enriques surface =

Algebraic surface with special triviality properties

In mathematics, Enriques surfaces are algebraic surfaces such that the irregularity q = 0 and the canonical line bundle K is non-trivial but has trivial square. Enriques surfaces are all projective (and therefore Kähler over the complex numbers) and are elliptic surfaces of genus 0. Over fields of characteristic not 2 they are quotients of K3 surfaces by a group of order 2 acting without fixed points and their theory is similar to that of algebraic K3 surfaces. Enriques surfaces were first studied in detail by Enriques (1896) as an answer to a question discussed by Castelnuovo (1895) about whether a surface with q = p_{g} = 0 is necessarily rational, though some of the Reye congruences introduced earlier by Reye (1882) are also examples of Enriques surfaces.

Enriques surfaces can also be defined over other fields. Over fields of characteristic other than 2, Artin (1960) showed that the theory is similar to that over the complex numbers. Over fields of characteristic 2 the definition is modified, and there are two new families, called singular and supersingular Enriques surfaces, described by Bombieri & Mumford (1976). These two extra families are related to the two non-discrete algebraic group schemes of order 2 in characteristic 2.

== Invariants of complex Enriques surfaces ==
The plurigenera P_{n} are 1 if n is even and 0 if n is odd. The fundamental group has order 2. The second cohomology group H^{2}(X, Z) is isomorphic to the sum of the unique even unimodular lattice II_{1,9} of dimension 10 and signature -8 and a group of order 2.

Hodge diamond:

		1
	0		0
0		10		0
	0		0
		1

Marked Enriques surfaces form a connected 10-dimensional family, which Kondo (1994) showed is rational.

== Characteristic 2 ==
In characteristic 2 there are some new families of Enriques surfaces, sometimes called quasi Enriques surfaces or non-classical Enriques surfaces or (super)singular Enriques surfaces. (The term "singular" does not mean that the surface has singularities, but means that the surface is "special" in some way.) In characteristic 2 the definition of Enriques surfaces is modified: they are defined to be minimal surfaces whose canonical class K is numerically equivalent to 0 and whose second Betti number is 10. (In characteristics other than 2 this is equivalent to the usual definition.) There are now 3 families of Enriques surfaces:

- Classical: dim(H^{1}(O)) = 0. This implies 2K = 0 but K is nonzero, and Pic^{τ} is Z/2Z. The surface is a quotient of a reduced singular Gorenstein surface by the group scheme μ_{2}.
- Singular: dim(H^{1}(O)) = 1 and is acted on non-trivially by the Frobenius endomorphism. This implies K = 0, and Pic^{τ} is μ_{2}. The surface is a quotient of a K3 surface by the group scheme Z/2Z.
- Supersingular: dim(H^{1}(O)) = 1 and is acted on trivially by the Frobenius endomorphism. This implies K = 0, and Pic^{τ} is α_{2}. The surface is a quotient of a reduced singular Gorenstein surface by the group scheme α_{2}.

All Enriques surfaces are elliptic or quasi elliptic.

== Examples ==
- A Reye congruence is the family of lines contained in at least 2 quadrics of a given 3-dimensional linear system of quadrics in P^{3}. If the linear system is generic then the Reye congruence is an Enriques surface. These were found by Reye (1882), and may be the earliest examples of Enriques surfaces.
- Take a surface of degree 6 in 3 dimensional projective space with double lines along the edges of a tetrahedron, such as

$$w^2x^2y^2 + w^2x^2z^2 + w^2y^2z^2 + x^2y^2z^2 + wxyzQ(w,x,y,z) = 0$$

for some general homogeneous polynomial Q of degree 2. Then its normalization is an Enriques surface. This is the family of examples found by Enriques (1896).

- The quotient of a K3 surface by a fixed point free involution is an Enriques surface, and all Enriques surfaces in characteristic other than 2 can be constructed like this. For example, if S is the K3 surface w^{4} + x^{4} + y^{4} + z^{4} = 0 and T is the order 4 automorphism taking (w,x,y,z) to (w,ix,–y,–iz) then T^{2} has eight fixed points. Blowing up these eight points and taking the quotient by T^{2} gives a K3 surface with a fixed-point-free involution T, and the quotient of this by T is an Enriques surface. Alternatively, the Enriques surface can be constructed by taking the quotient of the original surface by the order 4 automorphism T and resolving the eight singular points of the quotient. Another example is given by taking the intersection of 3 quadrics of the form P_{i}(u,v,w) + Q_{i}(x,y,z) = 0 in P^{5} and taking the quotient by the involution taking (u:v:w:x:y:z) to (u:v:w:-x:-y:-z). For generic quadrics this involution is a fixed-point-free involution of a K3 surface so the quotient is an Enriques surface.

== See also ==
- List of algebraic surfaces
- Enriques–Kodaira classification
- Supersingular variety

== Sources ==
- Artin, Michael (1960), On Enriques surfaces, PhD thesis, Harvard
- Compact Complex Surfaces by Wolf P. Barth, Klaus Hulek, Chris A.M. Peters, Antonius Van de Ven ISBN 3-540-00832-2 This is the standard reference book for compact complex surfaces.
- Bombieri, Enrico; Mumford, David (1976), "Enriques' classification of surfaces in char. p. III." (PDF), Inventiones Mathematicae, 35 (1): 197–232, Bibcode:1976InMat..35..197B, doi:10.1007/BF01390138, ISSN 0020-9910, MR 0491720, S2CID 122816845
- Castelnuovo, G. (1895), "Sulle superficie di genere zero", Mem. Delle Soc. Ital. Delle Scienze, Série III, 10: 103–123
- Cossec, François R.; Dolgachev, Igor V. (1989), Enriques surfaces. I, Progress in Mathematics, vol. 76, Boston: Birkhäuser Boston, ISBN 978-0-8176-3417-9, MR 0986969
- Dolgachev, Igor V. (2016), A brief introduction to Enriques surfaces (PDF)
- Enriques, Federigo (1896), "Introduzione alla geometria sopra le superficie algebriche.", Mem. Soc. Ital. Delle Scienze, 10: 1–81
- Enriques, Federigo (1949), Le Superficie Algebriche (PDF), Nicola Zanichelli, Bologna, MR 0031770
- Kondo, Shigeyuki (1994), "The rationality of the moduli space of Enriques surfaces", Compositio Mathematica, 91 (2): 159–173
- Reye, T. (1882), Die Geometrie der Lage, Leipzig: Baumgärtnerś Buchhandlung
