= Abelian surface =

Concept in algebraic geometry

In mathematics, an abelian surface is a 2-dimensional abelian variety.

One-dimensional complex tori are just elliptic curves and are all algebraic, but Riemann discovered that most complex tori of dimension 2 are not algebraic via the Riemann bilinear relations. Essentially, these are conditions on the parameter space of period matrices for complex tori which define an algebraic subvariety. This subvariety contains all of the points whose period matrices correspond to a period matrix of an abelian variety.

The algebraic ones are called abelian surfaces and are exactly the 2-dimensional abelian varieties. Most of their theory is a special case of the theory of higher-dimensional tori or abelian varieties. Finding criteria for a complex torus of dimension 2 to be a product of two elliptic curves (up to isogeny) was a popular subject of study in the nineteenth century.

Invariants: The plurigenera are all 1. The surface is diffeomorphic to S^{1}×S^{1}×S^{1}×S^{1} so the fundamental group is Z^{4}.

Hodge diamond:

		1
	2		2
1		4		1
	2		2
		1

Examples: A product of two elliptic curves. The Jacobian variety of a genus 2 curve.
