= Max Noether's theorem =

In algebraic geometry, Max Noether's theorem may refer to the results of Max Noether:

- Several closely related results of Max Noether on canonical curves
- AF+BG theorem, or Max Noether's fundamental theorem, a result on algebraic curves in the projective plane, on the residual sets of intersections
- Max Noether's theorem on curves lying on algebraic surfaces, which are hypersurfaces in P^{3}, or more generally complete intersections
- Noether's theorem on rationality for surfaces
- Max Noether theorem on the generation of the Cremona group by quadratic transformations

== See also ==
- Noether's theorem, usually referring to a result derived from work of Max's daughter Emmy Noether
- Noether inequality
- Special divisor
- Hirzebruch–Riemann–Roch theorem
