= Noether's theorem (disambiguation) =

Noether's theorem states that every differentiable symmetry of the action of a physical system has a corresponding conservation law.

Noether's theorem may also refer to:

== Theorems by Emmy Noether ==
- Noether's second theorem, on infinite-dimensional Lie algebras and differential equations
- Noether normalization lemma, on finitely generated algebras over a field
- Noether isomorphism theorems in abstract algebra

== Theorems by Max Noether ==
- Max Noether's theorem, several theorems
  - Noether's theorem on rationality for surfaces
  - Noether inequality, a property of compact minimal complex surfaces that restricts the topological type of the underlying topological 4-manifold

== See also ==
- Emmy Noether (1882–1935), German Jewish mathematician
- Herglotz–Noether theorem, in special relativity
- Lasker–Noether theorem, that states that every Noetherian ring is a Lasker ring
- Skolem–Noether theorem, which characterizes the automorphisms of simple rings
- Albert–Brauer–Hasse–Noether theorem, in algebraic number theory
- Brill–Noether theory, in the theory of algebraic curves
