= Riemann–Roch theorem for surfaces =

Mathematical theorem

- Field: Algebraic geometry
- First proof by: Guido Castelnuovo, Max Noether, Federigo Enriques
- First proof in: 1886, 1894, 1896, 1897
- Generalizations: Atiyah–Singer index theorem Grothendieck–Riemann–Roch theorem Hirzebruch–Riemann–Roch theorem
- Consequences: Riemann–Roch theorem

In mathematics, the Riemann–Roch theorem for surfaces describes the dimension of linear systems on an algebraic surface. The classical form of it was first given by Castelnuovo (1896, 1897), after preliminary versions of it were found by Max Noether (1886) and Enriques (1894). The sheaf-theoretic version is due to Hirzebruch.

== Statement ==
One form of the Riemann–Roch theorem states that if $D$ is a divisor on a non-singular projective surface then

$$\chi(D) = \chi(0) +\tfrac{1}{2} D . (D - K) \,$$

where $\chi$ is the holomorphic Euler characteristic, the dot $.$ is the intersection number, and $K$ is the canonical divisor. The constant $\chi(0)$ is the holomorphic Euler characteristic of the trivial bundle, and is equal to $1 + p_a$, where $p_a$ is the arithmetic genus of the surface. For comparison, the Riemann–Roch theorem for a curve states that $\chi(D) = \chi(0) + \operatorname{deg}(D)$.

== Noether's formula ==
Noether's formula states that

$$\chi = \frac{c_1^2+c_2}{12} = \frac{(K.K)+e}{12}$$

where χ=χ(0) is the holomorphic Euler characteristic, c_{1}^{2} = (K.K) is a Chern number and the self-intersection number of the canonical class K, and e = c_{2} is the topological Euler characteristic. It can be used to replace the term χ(0) in the Riemann–Roch theorem with topological terms; this gives the Hirzebruch–Riemann–Roch theorem for surfaces.

== Relation to the Hirzebruch–Riemann–Roch theorem ==
For surfaces, the Hirzebruch–Riemann–Roch theorem is essentially the Riemann–Roch theorem for surfaces combined with the Noether formula. To see this, recall that for each divisor D on a surface there is an invertible sheaf L = O(D) such that the linear system of D is more or less the space of sections of L. For surfaces the Todd class is $1 + c_1(X) / 2 + (c_1(X)^2 + c_2(X)) / 12$, and the Chern character of the sheaf L is just $1 + c_1(L) + c_1(L)^2 / 2$, so the Hirzebruch–Riemann–Roch theorem states that

$$\begin{align}
\chi(D) &= h^0(L) - h^1(L) + h^2(L)\\
&= \frac{1}{2} c_1(L)^2 + \frac{1}{2} c_1(L) \, c_1(X) + \frac{1}{12} \left(c_1(X)^2 + c_2(X)\right)
\end{align}$$

Fortunately this can be written in a clearer form as follows. First putting D = 0 shows that

$\chi(0) = \frac{1}{12}\left(c_1(X)^2 + c_2(X)\right)$ (Noether's formula)

For invertible sheaves (line bundles) the second Chern class vanishes. The products of second cohomology classes can be identified with intersection numbers in the Picard group, and we get a more classical version of Riemann Roch for surfaces:

$$\chi(D) = \chi(0) + \frac{1}{2}(D.D - D.K)$$

If we want, we can use Serre duality to express h^{2}(O(D)) as h^{0}(O(K − D)), but unlike the case of curves there is in general no easy way to write the h^{1}(O(D)) term in a form not involving sheaf cohomology (although in practice it often vanishes).

== Early versions ==
The earliest forms of the Riemann–Roch theorem for surfaces were often stated as an inequality rather than an equality, because there was no direct geometric description of first cohomology groups. A typical example is given by Zariski (1995, p. 78), which states that

$$r\ge n-\pi+p_a+1-i$$

where

- r is the dimension of the complete linear system |D| of a divisor D (so r = h^{0}(O(D)) −1)
- n is the virtual degree of D, given by the self-intersection number (D.D)
- π is the virtual genus of D, equal to 1 + (D.D + K.D)/2
- p_{a} is the arithmetic genus χ(O_{F}) − 1 of the surface
- i is the index of speciality of D, equal to dim H^{0}(O(K − D)) (which by Serre duality is the same as dim H^{2}(O(D))).

The difference between the two sides of this inequality was called the superabundance s of the divisor D. Comparing this inequality with the sheaf-theoretic version of the Riemann–Roch theorem shows that the superabundance of D is given by s = dim H^{1}(O(D)). The divisor D was called regular if i = s = 0 (or in other words if all higher cohomology groups of O(D) vanish) and superabundant if s > 0.
