= Heidelberg University Faculty of Mathematics and Computer Science =

Faculty of Mathematics and Computer Science
- Fakultät für Mathematik und Informatik
- Established: 2002
- Parent institution: University of Heidelberg
- Dean: Prof. Dr. M. Gertz
- Academic staff: 91
- Students: 1920
- Website: www.mathinf.uni-heidelberg.de
- Data as of 2016

The Faculty of Mathematics and Computer Science is one of twelve faculties at the University of Heidelberg. It comprises the Institute of Mathematics, the Institute of Applied Mathematics, the School of Applied Sciences, and the Institute of Computer Science. The faculty maintains close relationships to the Interdisciplinary Center for Scientific Computing (IWR) and the Mathematics Center Heidelberg (MATCH). The first chair of mathematics was the physician Jacob Curio in 1547.

== Institutes ==
=== Institute of Mathematics ===
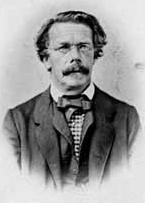
Otto Hesse

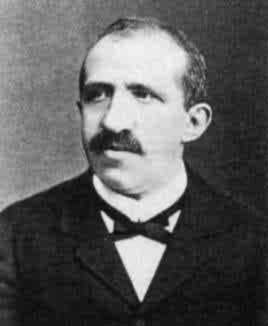
Leo Koenigsberger

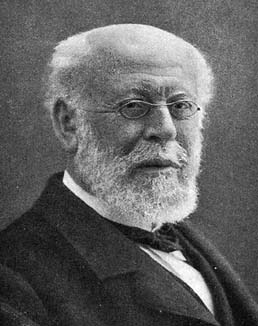
Moritz Benedikt Cantor

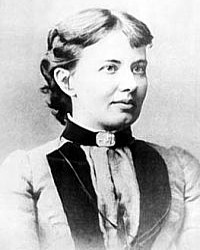
Sofia Kovalevskaya

In 1547, the first chair of mathematics was entrusted to the physician Jacob Curio. Today, areas of research include:

- Complex analysis: automorphic functions and modular forms
- Arithmetic: algebraic number theory, algorithmic algebra, and arithmetical geometry
- Topology and geometry: geometric partial differential equations, algebraic topology, differential topology, and differential geometry

=== Institute of Applied Mathematics ===
In 1957, Gottfried Köthe became the first director of the Institute of Applied Mathematics. Today, areas of research include:

- Probability theory and statistics: time-series analysis, nonparametrics, asymptotic statistical procedures, and computer-intensive statistical methods
- Applied analysis, numerical analysis and optimization, notably in the field of modelling and scientific computing.

=== Institute of Applied Sciences ===
In 1969, the Institute of Applied Sciences was founded. Its areas of research include:

- Media Computing, Business Computing and Health Care Computing.
- Communication, Robotics and Strategic Management.

=== Institute of Computer Science ===
In 2001, the Institute of Computer Science was founded. Today, areas of research include:

- Computability and computational complexity theory
- Efficient use of high-power computing systems
- Development, administration and use of web-based information systems
- Knowledge management in software development

== Noted mathematicians and computer scientists ==
- Moritz Benedikt Cantor: History of mathematics
- Immanuel Lazarus Fuchs: Fuchsian group, Picard–Fuchs equation
- Emil Julius Gumbel: Gumbel distribution
- Otto Hesse: Hessian curve, Hessian matrix, Hesse normal form
- Leo Koenigsberger
- Sofia Kovalevskaya: Cauchy–Kowalevski theorem
- Emanuel Lasker: Lasker–Noether theorem
- Jacob Lüroth
- Hans Maaß
- Max Noether: Max Noether's theorem
- Oskar Perron: Perron–Frobenius theorem, Perron's formula, Perron integral
- Hermann Schapira
- Friedrich Karl Schmidt
- Herbert Seifert: Seifert fiber space, Seifert surface, Seifert–van Kampen theorem, Seifert conjecture, Seifert–Weber space
- Paul Stäckel: twin prime
- William Threlfall
- Heinrich Weber: Kronecker–Weber theorem, Weber's theorem"
