= Noether family =

Family of German mathematicians

The Noether family is a family of German mathematicians, whose family name has been given to some of their mathematical contributions:

- Max Noether (1844–1921), father of Emmy and Fritz Noether,
  - Emmy Noether (1882–1935), professor at the University of Göttingen and at Bryn Mawr College
  - Fritz Noether (1884–1941), professor at the University of Tomsk
    - Gottfried E. Noether (1915–1991), son of Fritz Noether

== See also ==
- Noether's theorem (disambiguation)
- List of things named after Emmy Noether
