= Coherent sheaf cohomology =

Concept in algebraic geometry

In mathematics, especially in algebraic geometry and the theory of complex manifolds, coherent sheaf cohomology is a technique for producing functions with specified properties. Many geometric questions can be formulated as questions about the existence of sections of line bundles or of more general coherent sheaves; such sections can be viewed as generalized functions. Cohomology provides computable tools for producing sections, or explaining why they do not exist. It also provides invariants to distinguish one algebraic variety from another.

Much of algebraic geometry and complex analytic geometry is formulated in terms of coherent sheaves and their cohomology.

== Coherent sheaves ==
Coherent sheaves can be seen as a generalization of vector bundles. There is a notion of a coherent analytic sheaf on a complex analytic space, and an analogous notion of a coherent algebraic sheaf on a scheme. In both cases, the given space $X$ comes with a sheaf of rings $\mathcal O_X$, the sheaf of holomorphic functions or regular functions, and coherent sheaves are defined as a full subcategory of the category of $\mathcal O_X$-modules (that is, sheaves of $\mathcal O_X$-modules).

Vector bundles such as the tangent bundle play a fundamental role in geometry. More generally, for a closed subvariety $Y$ of $X$ with inclusion $i: Y \to X$, a vector bundle $E$ on $Y$ determines a coherent sheaf on $X$, the direct image sheaf $i_* E$, which is zero outside $Y$. In this way, many questions about subvarieties of $X$ can be expressed in terms of coherent sheaves on $X$.

Unlike vector bundles, coherent sheaves (in the analytic or algebraic case) form an abelian category, and so they are closed under operations such as taking kernels, images, and cokernels. On a scheme, the quasi-coherent sheaves are a generalization of coherent sheaves, including the locally free sheaves of infinite rank.

== Sheaf cohomology ==
For a sheaf $\mathcal F$ of abelian groups on a topological space $X$, the sheaf cohomology groups $H^i(X, \mathcal F)$ for integers $i$ are defined as the right derived functors of the functor of global sections, $\mathcal F \mapsto \mathcal F(X)$. As a result, $H^i(X, \mathcal F)$ is zero for $i < 0$, and $H^0(X, \mathcal F)$ can be identified with $\mathcal F(X)$. For any short exact sequence of sheaves $0\to \mathcal A \to \mathcal B \to \mathcal C\to 0$, there is a long exact sequence of cohomology groups:

$$0\to H^0(X,\mathcal A) \to H^0(X,\mathcal B) \to H^0(X,\mathcal C) \to H^1(X,\mathcal A) \to \cdots.$$

If $\mathcal F$ is a sheaf of $\mathcal O_X$-modules on a scheme $X$, then the cohomology groups $H^i(X, \mathcal F)$ (defined using the underlying topological space of $X$) are modules over the ring $\mathcal O(X)$ of regular functions. For example, if $X$ is a scheme over a field $k$, then the cohomology groups $H^i(X, \mathcal F)$ are $k$-vector spaces. The theory becomes powerful when $\mathcal F$ is a coherent or quasi-coherent sheaf, because of the following sequence of results.

== Vanishing theorems in the affine case ==
Complex analysis was revolutionized by Cartan's theorems A and B in 1953. These results say that if $\mathcal F$ is a coherent analytic sheaf on a Stein space $X$, then $\mathcal F$ is spanned by its global sections, and $H^i(X, \mathcal F) = 0$ for all $i > 0$. (A complex space $X$ is Stein if and only if it is isomorphic to a closed analytic subspace of $\Complex^n$ for some $n$.) These results generalize a large body of older work about the construction of complex analytic functions with given singularities or other properties.

In 1955, Serre introduced coherent sheaves into algebraic geometry (at first over an algebraically closed field, but that restriction was removed by Grothendieck). The analogs of Cartan's theorems hold in great generality: if $\mathcal F$ is a quasi-coherent sheaf on an affine scheme $X$, then $\mathcal F$ is spanned by its global sections, and $H^i(X, \mathcal F) = 0$ for $i>0$. This is related to the fact that the category of quasi-coherent sheaves on an affine scheme $X$ is equivalent to the category of $\mathcal O(X)$-modules, with the equivalence taking a sheaf $\mathcal F$ to the $\mathcal O(X)$-module $H^0(X, \mathcal F)$. In fact, affine schemes are characterized among all quasi-compact schemes by the vanishing of higher cohomology for quasi-coherent sheaves.

== Čech cohomology and the cohomology of projective space ==
As a consequence of the vanishing of cohomology for affine schemes: for a separated scheme $X$, an affine open covering $\{U_i\}$ of $X$, and a quasi-coherent sheaf $\mathcal F$ on $X$, the cohomology groups $H^*(X,\mathcal F)$ are isomorphic to the Čech cohomology groups with respect to the open covering $\{U_i\}$. In other words, knowing the sections of $\mathcal F$ on all finite intersections of the affine open subschemes $U_i$ determines the cohomology of $X$ with coefficients in $\mathcal F$.

Using Čech cohomology, one can compute the cohomology of projective space with coefficients in any line bundle. Namely, for a field $k$, a positive integer $n$, and any integer $j$, the cohomology of projective space $\mathbb{P}^n$ over $k$ with coefficients in the line bundle $\mathcal O(j)$ is given by:

$$H^i(\mathbb{P}^n,\mathcal O(j)) \cong \begin{cases}
\bigoplus_{a_0,\ldots,a_n\geq 0,\; a_0+\cdots+a_n=j}\; k\cdot x_0^{a_0}\cdots x_n^{a_n} & i=0\\[6pt]
0 & i \neq 0, n\\[6pt]
\bigoplus_{a_0, \ldots,a_n<0,\; a_0+\cdots+a_n=j}\; k\cdot x_0^{a_0}\cdots x_n^{a_n} & i=n
\end{cases}$$

In particular, this calculation shows that the cohomology of projective space over $k$ with coefficients in any line bundle has finite dimension as a $k$-vector space.

The vanishing of these cohomology groups above dimension $n$ is a very special case of Grothendieck's vanishing theorem: for any sheaf of abelian groups $\mathcal F$ on a Noetherian topological space $X$ of dimension $n<\infty$, $H^i(X,\mathcal F) = 0$ for all $i>n$. This is especially useful for $X$ a Noetherian scheme (for example, a variety over a field) and $\mathcal F$ a quasi-coherent sheaf.

== Sheaf cohomology of plane-curves ==
Given a smooth projective plane curve $C$ of degree $d$, the sheaf cohomology $H^*(C,\mathcal{O}_C)$ can be readily computed using a long exact sequence in cohomology. First note that for the embedding $i:C \to \mathbb{P}^2$ there is the isomorphism of cohomology groups

$$H^*(\mathbb{P}^2, i_*\mathcal{O}_C) \cong H^*(C, \mathcal{O}_C)$$

since $i_*$ is exact. This means that the short exact sequence of coherent sheaves

$$0 \to \mathcal{O}(-d) \to \mathcal{O} \to i_*\mathcal{O}_C \to 0$$

on $\mathbb{P}^2$, called the ideal sequence, can be used to compute cohomology via the long exact sequence in cohomology. The sequence reads as

$$\begin{align}
0&\to  H^0(\mathbb{P}^2, \mathcal{O}(-d)) \to H^0(\mathbb{P}^2, \mathcal{O}) \to H^0(\mathbb{P}^2, \mathcal{O}_C)\\
&\to  H^1(\mathbb{P}^2, \mathcal{O}(-d)) \to H^1(\mathbb{P}^2, \mathcal{O}) \to H^1(\mathbb{P}^2, \mathcal{O}_C)\\
&\to  H^2(\mathbb{P}^2, \mathcal{O}(-d)) \to H^2(\mathbb{P}^2, \mathcal{O}) \to H^2(\mathbb{P}^2, \mathcal{O}_C)
\end{align}$$

which can be simplified using the previous computations on projective space. For simplicity, assume the base ring is $\C$ (or any algebraically closed field). Then there are the isomorphisms

$$\begin{align}
H^0(C,\mathcal{O}_C) &\cong H^0(\mathbb{P}^2,\mathcal{O}) \\
H^1(C,\mathcal{O}_C) &\cong H^2(\mathbb{P}^2,\mathcal{O}(-d))
\end{align}$$

which shows that $H^1$ of the curve is a finite dimensional vector space of rank

$${d-1 \choose d-3 } = \frac{(d-1)(d-2)}{2}$$.

== Künneth Theorem ==
There is an analogue of the Künneth formula in coherent sheaf cohomology for products of varieties. Given quasi-compact schemes $X,Y$ with affine-diagonals over a field $k$, (e.g. separated schemes), and let $\mathcal{F} \in \text{Coh}(X)$ and $\mathcal{G} \in \text{Coh}(Y)$, then there is an isomorphism

$H^k(X\times_{\text{Spec}(k)}Y, \pi_1^*\mathcal{F}\otimes_{\mathcal{O}_{X\times_{\text{Spec}(k)} Y}}\pi_2^*\mathcal{G}) \cong \bigoplus_{i+j = k} H^i(X,\mathcal{F})\otimes_k H^j(Y,\mathcal{G})$

where $\pi_1,\pi_2$ are the canonical projections of $X\times_{\text{Spec}(k)} Y$ to $X,Y$.

=== Computing sheaf cohomology of curves ===
In $X = \mathbb{P}^1 \times \mathbb{P}^1$, a generic section of $\mathcal{O}_X(a,b) = \pi_1^*\mathcal{O}_{\mathbb{P}^1}(a) \otimes_{\mathcal{O}_X} \pi_2^*\mathcal{O}_{\mathbb{P}^1}(b)$ defines a curve $C$, giving the ideal sequence

$0 \to \mathcal{O}_X(-a,-b) \to \mathcal{O}_X \to \mathcal{O}_C \to 0$

Then, the long exact sequence reads as

$$\begin{align}
0&\to  H^0(X, \mathcal{O}(-a,-b)) \to H^0(X, \mathcal{O}) \to H^0(X, \mathcal{O}_C)\\
&\to  H^1(X, \mathcal{O}(-a,-b)) \to H^1(X, \mathcal{O}) \to H^1(X, \mathcal{O}_C)\\
&\to  H^2(X, \mathcal{O}(-a,-b)) \to H^2(X, \mathcal{O}) \to H^2(X, \mathcal{O}_C)
\end{align}$$

giving

$$\begin{align}
H^0(C,\mathcal{O}_C) &\cong H^0(X,\mathcal{O}) \\
H^1(C,\mathcal{O}_C) &\cong H^2(X,\mathcal{O}(-a,-b))
\end{align}$$

Since $H^1$ is the genus of the curve, we can use the Künneth formula to compute its Betti numbers. This is

$H^2(X, \mathcal{O}_X(-a,-b)) \cong H^1(\mathbb{P}^1,\mathcal{O}(-a))\otimes_kH^1(\mathbb{P}^1,\mathcal{O}(-b))$

which is of rank

$\binom{a-1}{a-2}\binom{b-1}{b-2} = (a-1)(b-1) = ab - a - b +1$

for $-a,-b \leq -2$. In particular, if $C$ is defined by the vanishing locus of a generic section of $\mathcal{O}(2,k)$, it is of genus

$2k-2-k+1 = k-1$

hence a curve of any genus can be found inside of $\mathbb{P}^1\times\mathbb{P}^1$.

== Finite-dimensionality ==
For a proper scheme $X$ over a field $k$ and any coherent sheaf $\mathcal F$ on $X$, the cohomology groups $H^i(X,\mathcal F)$ have finite dimension as $k$-vector spaces. In the special case where $X$ is projective over $k$, this is proved by reducing to the case of line bundles on projective space, discussed above. In the general case of a proper scheme over a field, Grothendieck proved the finiteness of cohomology by reducing to the projective case, using Chow's lemma.

The finite-dimensionality of cohomology also holds in the analogous situation of coherent analytic sheaves on any compact complex space, by a very different argument. Cartan and Serre proved finite-dimensionality in this analytic situation using a theorem of Schwartz on compact operators in Fréchet spaces. Relative versions of this result for a proper morphism were proved by Grothendieck (for locally Noetherian schemes) and by Grauert (for complex analytic spaces). Namely, for a proper morphism $f: X\to Y$ (in the algebraic or analytic setting) and a coherent sheaf $\mathcal F$ on $X$, the higher direct image sheaves $R^i f_*\mathcal F$ are coherent. When $Y$ is a point, this theorem gives the finite-dimensionality of cohomology.

The finite-dimensionality of cohomology leads to many numerical invariants for projective varieties. For example, if $X$ is a smooth projective curve over an algebraically closed field $k$, the genus of $X$ is defined to be the dimension of the $k$-vector space $H^1(X,\mathcal O_X)$. When $k$ is the field of complex numbers, this agrees with the genus of the space $X(\Complex)$ of complex points in its classical (Euclidean) topology. (In that case, $X(\Complex) = X^{an}$ is a closed oriented surface.) Among many possible higher-dimensional generalizations, the geometric genus of a smooth projective variety $X$ of dimension $n$ is the dimension of $H^n(X, \mathcal O_X)$, and the arithmetic genus (according to one convention) is the alternating sum

$$\chi(X, \mathcal{O}_X)=\sum_j (-1)^j\dim_k(H^j(X, \mathcal O_X)).$$

== Serre duality ==
Serre duality is an analog of Poincaré duality for coherent sheaf cohomology. In this analogy, the canonical bundle $K_X$ plays the role of the orientation sheaf. Namely, for a smooth proper scheme $X$ of dimension $n$ over a field $k$, there is a natural trace map $H^n(X, K_X)\to k$, which is an isomorphism if $X$ is geometrically connected, meaning that the base change of $X$ to an algebraic closure of $k$ is connected. Serre duality for a vector bundle $E$ on $X$ says that the product

$$H^i(X,E)\times H^{n-i}(X,K_X\otimes E^*)\to H^n(X,K_X)\to k$$

is a perfect pairing for every integer $i$. In particular, the $k$-vector spaces $H^i(X, E)$ and $H^{n-i}(X, K_X\otimes E^*)$ have the same (finite) dimension. (Serre also proved Serre duality for holomorphic vector bundles on any compact complex manifold.) Grothendieck duality theory includes generalizations to any coherent sheaf and any proper morphism of schemes, although the statements become less elementary.

For example, for a smooth projective curve $X$ over an algebraically closed field $k$, Serre duality implies that the dimension of the space $H^0(X, \Omega^1) = H^0(X, K_X)$ of 1-forms on $X$ is equal to the genus of $X$ (the dimension of $H^1(X,\mathcal O_X)$).

== GAGA theorems ==
GAGA theorems relate algebraic varieties over the complex numbers to the corresponding analytic spaces. For a scheme X of finite type over C, there is a functor from coherent algebraic sheaves on X to coherent analytic sheaves on the associated analytic space X^{an}. The key GAGA theorem (by Grothendieck, generalizing Serre's theorem on the projective case) is that if X is proper over C, then this functor is an equivalence of categories. Moreover, for every coherent algebraic sheaf E on a proper scheme X over C, the natural map

$$H^i(X,E)\to H^i(X^{\text{an}},E^{\text{an}})$$

of (finite-dimensional) complex vector spaces is an isomorphism for all i. (The first group here is defined using the Zariski topology, and the second using the classical (Euclidean) topology.) For example, the equivalence between algebraic and analytic coherent sheaves on projective space implies Chow's theorem that every closed analytic subspace of CP^{n} is algebraic.

== Vanishing theorems ==
Serre's vanishing theorem says that for any ample line bundle $L$ on a proper scheme $X$ over a Noetherian ring, and any coherent sheaf $\mathcal F$ on $X$, there is an integer $m_0$ such that for all $m\geq m_0$, the sheaf $\mathcal F\otimes L^{\otimes m}$ is spanned by its global sections and has no cohomology in positive degrees.

Although Serre's vanishing theorem is useful, the inexplicitness of the number $m_0$ can be a problem. The Kodaira vanishing theorem is an important explicit result. Namely, if $X$ is a smooth projective variety over a field of characteristic zero, $L$ is an ample line bundle on $X$, and $K_X$ a canonical bundle, then

$$H^j(X,K_X\otimes L)=0$$

for all $j>0$. Note that Serre's theorem guarantees the same vanishing for large powers of $L$. Kodaira vanishing and its generalizations are fundamental to the classification of algebraic varieties and the minimal model program. Kodaira vanishing fails over fields of positive characteristic.

== Hodge theory ==
The Hodge theorem relates coherent sheaf cohomology to singular cohomology (or de Rham cohomology). Namely, if $X$ is a smooth complex projective variety, then there is a canonical direct-sum decomposition of complex vector spaces:

$$H^a(X,\mathbf{C})\cong \bigoplus_{b=0}^a H^{a-b}(X,\Omega^b),$$

for every $a$. The group on the left means the singular cohomology of $X(\mathbf C)$ in its classical (Euclidean) topology, whereas the groups on the right are cohomology groups of coherent sheaves, which (by GAGA) can be taken either in the Zariski or in the classical topology. The same conclusion holds for any smooth proper scheme $X$ over $\mathbf C$, or for any compact Kähler manifold.

For example, the Hodge theorem implies that the definition of the genus of a smooth projective curve $X$ as the dimension of $H^1(X, \mathcal O)$, which makes sense over any field $k$, agrees with the topological definition (as half the first Betti number) when $k$ is the complex numbers. Hodge theory has inspired a large body of work on the topological properties of complex algebraic varieties.

== Riemann–Roch theorems ==
For a proper scheme X over a field k, the Euler characteristic of a coherent sheaf E on X is the integer

$$\chi(X,E)=\sum_j (-1)^j\dim_k(H^j(X,E)).$$

The Euler characteristic of a coherent sheaf E can be computed from the Chern classes of E, according to the Riemann–Roch theorem and its generalizations, the Hirzebruch–Riemann–Roch theorem and the Grothendieck–Riemann–Roch theorem. For example, if L is a line bundle on a smooth proper geometrically connected curve X over a field k, then

$$\chi(X,L)=\text{deg}(L)-\text{genus}(X)+1,$$

where deg(L) denotes the degree of L.

When combined with a vanishing theorem, the Riemann–Roch theorem can often be used to determine the dimension of the vector space of sections of a line bundle. Knowing that a line bundle on X has enough sections, in turn, can be used to define a map from X to projective space, perhaps a closed immersion. This approach is essential for classifying algebraic varieties.

The Riemann–Roch theorem also holds for holomorphic vector bundles on a compact complex manifold, by the Atiyah–Singer index theorem.

== Growth ==
Dimensions of cohomology groups on a scheme of dimension n can grow at most like a polynomial of degree n.

Let X be a projective scheme of dimension n and D a divisor on X. If $\mathcal F$ is any coherent sheaf on X then

$h^i(X,\mathcal F(mD))=O(m^n)$ for every i.

For a higher cohomology of nef divisor D on X;

$$h^i(X,\mathcal O_X(mD))=O(m^{n-1})$$

== Applications ==
Given a scheme X over a field k, deformation theory studies the deformations of X to infinitesimal neighborhoods. The simplest case, concerning deformations over the ring $R := k[\epsilon]/\epsilon^2$ of dual numbers, examines whether there is a scheme X_{R} over Spec R such that the special fiber

$$X_R \times_{\operatorname{Spec } R} \operatorname{Spec} k$$

is isomorphic to the given X. Coherent sheaf cohomology with coefficients in the tangent sheaf $T_X$ controls this class of deformations of X, provided X is smooth. Namely,

- isomorphism classes of deformations of the above type are parametrized by the first coherent cohomology $H^1(X, T_X)$,
- there is an element (called the obstruction class) in $H^2(X, T_X)$ which vanishes if and only if a deformation of X over Spec R as above exists.
