= Relative effective Cartier divisor =

In algebraic geometry, a relative effective Cartier divisor is roughly a family of effective Cartier divisors. Precisely, an effective Cartier divisor in a scheme X over a ring R is a closed subscheme D of X that (1) is flat over R and (2) the ideal sheaf $I(D)$ of D is locally free of rank one (i.e., invertible sheaf). Equivalently, a closed subscheme D of X is an effective Cartier divisor if there is an open affine cover $U_i = \operatorname{Spec} A_i$ of X and nonzerodivisors $f_i \in A_i$ such that the intersection $D \cap U_i$ is given by the equation $f_i = 0$ (called local equations) and $A / f_i A$ is flat over R and such that they are compatible.

== An effective Cartier divisor as the zero-locus of a section of a line bundle ==
Let L be a line bundle on X and s a section of it such that $s: \mathcal{O}_X \hookrightarrow L$ (in other words, s is a $\mathcal{O}_X(U)$-regular element for any open subset U.)

Choose some open cover $\{ U_i \}$ of X such that $L|_{U_i} \simeq \mathcal{O}_X|_{U_i}$. For each i, through the isomorphisms, the restriction $s|_{U_i}$ corresponds to a nonzerodivisor $f_i$ of $\mathcal{O}_X(U_i)$. Now, define the closed subscheme $\{ s = 0 \}$ of X (called the zero-locus of the section s) by

$$\{ s = 0 \} \cap U_i = \{ f_i = 0 \},$$

where the right-hand side means the closed subscheme of $U_i$ given by the ideal sheaf generated by $f_i$. This is well-defined (i.e., they agree on the overlaps) since $f_i/f_j|_{U_i \cap U_j}$ is a unit element. For the same reason, the closed subscheme $\{ s = 0 \}$ is independent of the choice of local trivializations.

Equivalently, the zero locus of s can be constructed as a fiber of a morphism; namely, viewing L as the total space of it, the section s is a X-morphism of L: a morphism $s: X \to L$ such that s followed by $L \to X$ is the identity. Then $\{ s = 0 \}$ may be constructed as the fiber product of s and the zero-section embedding $s_0: X \to L$.

Finally, when $\{ s = 0 \}$ is flat over the base scheme S, it is an effective Cartier divisor on X over S. Furthermore, this construction exhausts all effective Cartier divisors on X as follows. Let D be an effective Cartier divisor and $I(D)$ denote the ideal sheaf of D. Because of locally-freeness, taking $I(D)^{-1} \otimes_{\mathcal{O}_X} -$ of $0 \to I(D) \to \mathcal{O}_X \to \mathcal{O}_D \to 0$ gives the exact sequence

$$0 \to \mathcal{O}_X \to I(D)^{-1} \to I(D)^{-1} \otimes \mathcal{O}_D \to 0$$

In particular, 1 in $\Gamma(X, \mathcal{O}_X)$ can be identified with a section in $\Gamma(X, I(D)^{-1})$, which we denote by $s_D$.

Now we can repeat the early argument with $L = I(D)^{-1}$. Since D is an effective Cartier divisor, D is locally of the form $\{ f = 0 \}$ on $U = \operatorname{Spec}(A)$ for some nonzerodivisor f in A. The trivialization $L|_U = Af^{-1} \overset{\sim}\to A$ is given by multiplication by f; in particular, 1 corresponds to f. Hence, the zero-locus of $s_D$ is D.

== Properties ==
- If D and D' are effective Cartier divisors, then the sum $D + D'$ is the effective Cartier divisor defined locally as $fg = 0$ if f, g give local equations for D and D' .
- If D is an effective Cartier divisor and $R \to R'$ is a ring homomorphism, then $D \times_R R'$ is an effective Cartier divisor in $X \times_R R'$.
- If D is an effective Cartier divisor and $f: X' \to X$ a flat morphism over R, then $D' = D \times_X X'$ is an effective Cartier divisor in X' with the ideal sheaf $I(D') = f^* (I(D))$.

== Examples ==
=== Effective Cartier divisors on a relative curve ===
From now on suppose X is a smooth curve (still over R). Let D be an effective Cartier divisor in X and assume it is proper over R (which is immediate if X is proper.) Then $\Gamma(D, \mathcal{O}_D)$ is a locally free R-module of finite rank. This rank is called the degree of D and is denoted by $\deg D$. It is a locally constant function on $\operatorname{Spec} R$. If D and D' are proper effective Cartier divisors, then $D + D'$ is proper over R and $\deg(D + D') = \deg(D) + \deg(D')$. Let $f: X' \to X$ be a finite flat morphism. Then $\deg(f^* D) = \deg(f) \deg(D)$. On the other hand, a base change does not change degree: $\deg(D \times_R R') = \deg(D)$.

A closed subscheme D of X is finite, flat and of finite presentation if and only if it is an effective Cartier divisor that is proper over R.

== Weil divisors associated to effective Cartier divisors ==
Given an effective Cartier divisor D, there are two equivalent ways to associate Weil divisor $[D]$ to it.
