= Gonality of an algebraic curve =

In mathematics, the gonality of an algebraic curve C is defined as the lowest degree of a nonconstant rational map from C to the projective line. In more algebraic terms, if C is defined over the field K and K(C) denotes the function field of C, then the gonality is the minimum value taken by the degrees of field extensions

K(C)/K(f)

of the function field over its subfields generated by single functions f.

If K is algebraically closed, then the gonality is 1 precisely for curves of genus 0. The gonality is 2 for curves of genus 1 (elliptic curves) and for hyperelliptic curves (this includes all curves of genus 2). For genus g ≥ 3 it is no longer the case that the genus determines the gonality. The gonality of a curve of genus g is less than or equal to the floor function of

(g + 3)/2.

Trigonal curves are those with gonality 3, and this case gave rise to the name in general. Trigonal curves include the Picard curves, of genus three and given by an equation

y^{3} = Q(x)

where Q is of degree 4.

The gonality conjecture, of M. Green and R. Lazarsfeld, predicts that the gonality of the algebraic curve C can be calculated by homological algebra means, from a minimal resolution of an invertible sheaf of high degree. In many cases the gonality is two more than the Clifford index. The Green–Lazarsfeld conjecture is an exact formula in terms of the graded Betti numbers for a degree d embedding in r dimensions, for d large with respect to the genus. Writing b(C), with respect to a given such embedding of C and the minimal free resolution for its homogeneous coordinate ring, for the minimum index i for which β_{i, i + 1} is zero, then the conjectured formula for the gonality is

r + 1 − b(C).

According to the 1900 ICM talk of Federico Amodeo, the notion (but not the terminology) originated in Section V of Riemann's Theory of Abelian Functions. Amodeo used the term "gonalità" as early as 1893.
