= Gerhard Haenzel =

German mathematician (1898–1944)

Gerhard Karl Theodor Haenzel (5 March 1898, Wolin, Pomerania (German Empire) – 6 March 1944, Lesneven, Brittany (occupied France)) was a German mathematician.

== Education and career ==
Haenzel, whose father was a teacher and school board member, completed his Abitur after studying from 1907 to 1915 at the Peter Gröning-Gymnasium in Stargard. Shortly after his Abitur, he was called up in July 1915 for active military service. His military service lasted until 30 September 1920 and he attained the rank of lieutenant. He was on the Eastern and Western fronts and in the German fight against the Polish uprising. He suffered a serious wound and was awarded the Iron Cross 1st and 2nd class. From 1920 to 1925 he studied mathematics and physics at the Technische Hochschule Berlin (TH Berlin) and then worked there successively as an assistant to the mathematician Georg Hamel, then to Stanislaus Jolles, and finally to Erich Salkowski. In 1926 Haenzel received his engineering doctorate with dissertation Zur synthetischen Theorie der Mechanik starrer Körper (On synthetic theory of the mechanics of rigid bodies) under the supervision of Stanislaus Jolles at TH Berlin. There Haenzel completed in 1929 his habilitation under the supervision of Erich Salkowski. From 1929 to 1933 Haenzel worked as a Privatdozent at TH Berlin.

In 1933 he was appointed a professor of geometry (as successor to Richard Baldus) at the Technische Hochschule Karlsruhe (TH Karlsruhe). In 1936 he was an invited speaker at the International Congress of Mathematicians in Oslo. Haenzel did research on algebraic geometry and the relationships between geometry and physics. In 1937 he was appointed to the professorial chair for mathematics and mathematical technology at TH Karlsruhe. Of particular interest is his research revealing the equivalence of the structure of the operators of the Dirac wave equation with various configurations of projective geometry and line geometry, as well as the icosahedral group. In 1940 he received the post-graduate degree Dr. rer. nat. from the University of Freiburg with a thesis on geometry and wave mechanics under the supervision of Wilhelm Süss. In 1943 Haenzel resigned from TH Karlsruhe and accepted a professorial chair in mathematics at the University of Münster. Soon after, he was drafted into military service. He committed suicide in Brittany. According to Max Pinl, his death in occupied France was due to pressure from the political intrigue of a court-martial in Lesneven.

== Selected publications ==
- Ein neuer Satz über die Nullstellen ganzer rationaler Funktionen, Sitzungsberichte Berliner Mathematische Gesellschaft, vol. 27, 1928, pp. 17–19
- Über die charakteristischen Involutionen der nicht-euklidischen Bewegungen, Monatshefte für Mathematik, vol. 37, 1930, pp. 209–214
- Über eine Klasse von Abelschen Gleichungen, Jahresberichte DMV, vol. 41, 1931, pp. 39–47
- Über die zeitlich veränderliche Metrik, Monatshefte f. Math. und Physik, vol. 39, 1932, pp. 267–278
- Über Lösungen der Gravitationsgleichungen Einsteins, Zeitschrift für Physik, vol. 72, 1931, pp. 798–802 doi:10.1007/BF01342001
- Euklidische Geometrie, nichteuklidische Geometrie und Raum-Zeit-Struktur im System Spinozas, Sitzungsberichte Berliner Mathem. Gesellschaft, vol. 31, 1932, pp. 55–67
- Eine geometrische Konstruktion der transfiniten Zahlen Cantors, Journal f. Math., vol. 170, 1934, pp. 123–128 doi:10.1515/crll.1934.170.123
- Nichteuklidische Geometrie und ihre Verwendung in der Physik, Tohoku Math. Journal, vol. 43, 1937, pp. 169–181
- Geometrie und Wellenmechanik, Parts 1,2,3, Jahresbericht DMV, Part I, vol. 49, 1939, pp. 215–242; Part II, vol. 50, 1940, pp. 121–129; Part III, vol. 52, 1942, pp. 103–117
- Die Diracsche Wellengleichung und das Ikosaeder, Journal f. Math., vol. 183, 1941, pp. 232–242 doi:10.1515/crll.1941.183.232
- Die Brogliesche Theorie des Photons in geometrischer Darstellung, Zeitschrift für technische Physik, vol. 24, 1943, pp. 87–90

== Sources ==
- Haenzel, Gerhard. In: Deutsche Biographische Enzyklopädie, 2nd edition, vol. 4, München 2006, pp. 335–336.
