= Characteristic power series =

In mathematics, characteristic power series may refer to:

- Multiplicative sequence
- Iwasawa algebra
