= Todd class =

Characteristic class in algebraic topology

In mathematics, the Todd class is a construction in the algebraic topology of characteristic classes. The Todd class of a vector bundle can be defined in terms of Chern classes within various theories, notably in differential topology, complex manifolds and algebraic geometry. In rough terms, a Todd class acts like a reciprocal of a Chern class, or stands in relation to it as a conormal bundle does to a normal bundle.

The Todd class plays a crucial role in generalising the classical Riemann–Roch theorem to higher dimensions in the Hirzebruch–Riemann–Roch theorem and the Grothendieck–Hirzebruch–Riemann–Roch theorem.

== History ==
It is named for J. A. Todd, who introduced a special case of the concept in algebraic geometry in 1937, before the Chern classes were defined. The geometric idea involved is sometimes called the Todd-Eger class. The general definition in higher dimensions is due to Friedrich Hirzebruch.

== Definition ==
To define the Todd class $\operatorname{td}(E)$ where $E$ is a complex vector bundle on a topological space $X$, it is usually possible to limit the definition to the case of a Whitney sum of line bundles, by means of a general device of characteristic class theory, the use of Chern roots (aka, the splitting principle). For the definition, consider the formal power series

$$Q(x) = \frac{x}{1 - e^{-x}}=\sum_{i=0}^\infty \frac{B_i}{i!}x^i = 1 +\dfrac{x}{2}+\dfrac{x^2}{12}-\dfrac{x^4}{720}+\cdots$$

where $B_i$ denotes the $i$-th Bernoulli number (with $B_1 = \tfrac{1}{2}$). The coefficient of $x^n$ in $Q(x)^{n+1}$ is 1, which follows from the Lagrange inversion formula applied to the inverse functions $f(x)=1-e^{-x}$ and $g(x)=-\log(1-x)$. Consider the coefficient of $x^j$ in the product

$$\prod_{i=1}^m  Q(\beta_i x)$$

for any $m > j$. This is symmetric in the $\beta_i$s and homogeneous of weight $j$: so can be expressed as a polynomial $\operatorname{td}_j(p_1,\ldots, p_j)$ in the elementary symmetric functions $p$ of the $\beta_i$s. Then $\operatorname{td}_j$ defines the Todd polynomials: they form a multiplicative sequence with $Q$ as characteristic power series.

If $E$ has the $\alpha_i$ as its Chern roots, then the Todd class is:

$$\operatorname{td}(E) = \prod Q(\alpha_i),$$

which is to be computed in the cohomology ring of $X$ (or in its completion if one wants to consider infinite-dimensional manifolds).

The Todd class can be given explicitly as a formal power series in the Chern classes as follows:

$$\operatorname{td}(E) = 1 + \frac{c_1}{2} + \frac{c_1^2 +c_2}{12} + \frac{c_1c_2}{24} + \frac{-c_1^4 + 4 c_1^2 c_2 + c_1c_3 + 3c_2^2 - c_4}{720} + \cdots$$

where the cohomology classes $c_i$ are the Chern classes of $E$, and lie in the cohomology group $H^{2i}(X)$. If $X$ is finite-dimensional then most terms vanish and $\operatorname{td}(E)$ is a polynomial in the Chern classes.

== Properties of the Todd class ==
The Todd class is multiplicative:

$$\operatorname{td}(E\oplus F) = \operatorname{td}(E)\cdot \operatorname{td}(F).$$

Let $\xi \in H^2({\mathbb C} P^n)$ be the fundamental class of the hyperplane section. From multiplicativity and the Euler exact sequence for the tangent bundle of ${\mathbb C} P^n$

$$0 \to  {\mathcal O} \to {\mathcal O}(1)^{n+1}   \to T {\mathbb C} P^n \to 0,$$

one obtains

$$\operatorname{td}(T {\mathbb C}P^n) =  \left( \dfrac{\xi}{1-e^{-\xi}} \right)^{n+1}.$$

== Computations of the Todd class ==
For any algebraic curve $C$ the Todd class is just $\operatorname{td}(C) = 1 + \frac{1}{2} c_1(T_C)$. Since $C$ is projective, it can be embedded into some $\mathbb{P}^n$ and we can find $c_1(T_C)$ using the normal sequence

$0 \to T_C \to T_\mathbb{P^n}|_C \to N_{C/\mathbb{P}^n} \to 0$

and properties of chern classes. For example, if we have a degree $d$ plane curve in $\mathbb{P}^2$, we find the total chern class is

$$\begin{align}
c(T_C) &= \frac{c(T_{\mathbb{P}^2}|_C)}{c(N_{C/\mathbb{P}^2})} \\
&= \frac{1+3[H]}{1+d[H]} \\
&= (1+3[H])(1-d[H]) \\
&= 1 + (3-d)[H]
\end{align}$$

where $[H]$ is the hyperplane class in $\mathbb{P}^2$ restricted to $C$.

== Hirzebruch-Riemann-Roch formula ==
For any coherent sheaf F on a smooth compact complex manifold M, one has

$$\chi(F)=\int_M \operatorname{ch}(F) \wedge \operatorname{td}(TM),$$

where $\chi(F)$ is its holomorphic Euler characteristic,

$$\chi(F):= \sum_{i=0}^{\text{dim}_{\mathbb{C}}  M} (-1)^i \text{dim}_{\mathbb{C}} H^i(M,F),$$

and $\operatorname{ch}(F)$ its Chern character.

== See also ==
- Genus of a multiplicative sequence
