= Hirzebruch–Riemann–Roch theorem =

On the Euler characteristic of a holomorphic vector bundle on a compact complex manifold

- Field: Algebraic geometry
- First proof by: Friedrich Hirzebruch
- First proof in: 1954
- Generalizations: Atiyah–Singer index theorem Grothendieck–Riemann–Roch theorem
- Consequences: Riemann–Roch theorem Riemann–Roch theorem for surfaces

In mathematics, the Hirzebruch–Riemann–Roch theorem, named after Friedrich Hirzebruch, Bernhard Riemann, and Gustav Roch, is Hirzebruch's 1954 result generalizing the classical Riemann–Roch theorem on Riemann surfaces to all complex algebraic varieties of higher dimensions. The result paved the way for the Grothendieck–Hirzebruch–Riemann–Roch theorem proved about three years later.

== Statement of Hirzebruch–Riemann–Roch theorem ==
The Hirzebruch–Riemann–Roch theorem applies to any holomorphic vector bundle E on a compact complex manifold X, to calculate the holomorphic Euler characteristic of E in sheaf cohomology, namely the alternating sum

$$\chi(X,E) = \sum_{i=0}^{n} (-1)^{i} \dim_{\Complex} H^{i}(X,E)$$

of the dimensions as complex vector spaces, where n is the complex dimension of X.

Hirzebruch's theorem states that χ(X, E) is computable in terms of the Chern classes c_{k}(E) of E, and the Todd classes $\operatorname{td}_{j}(X)$ of the holomorphic tangent bundle of X. These all lie in the cohomology ring of X; by use of the fundamental class (or, in other words, integration over X) we can obtain numbers from classes in $H^{2n}(X).$ The Hirzebruch formula asserts that

$$\chi(X,E) = \sum_{j=0}^{n} \operatorname{ch}_{n-j}(E) \operatorname{td}_{j}(X),$$

using the Chern character ch(E) in cohomology. In other words, the products are formed in the cohomology ring of all the 'matching' degrees that add up to 2n. Formulated differently, it gives the equality

$$\chi(X,E) = \int_X \operatorname{ch}(E) \operatorname{td}(X)$$

where $\operatorname{td}(X)$ is the Todd class of the tangent bundle of X.

Significant special cases are when E is a complex line bundle, and when X is an algebraic surface (Noether's formula). Weil's Riemann–Roch theorem for vector bundles on curves, and the Riemann–Roch theorem for algebraic surfaces (see below), are included in its scope. The formula also expresses in a precise way the vague notion that the Todd classes are in some sense reciprocals of the Chern Character.

== Riemann Roch theorem for curves ==
For curves, the Hirzebruch–Riemann–Roch theorem is essentially the classical Riemann–Roch theorem. To see this, recall that for each divisor D on a curve there is an invertible sheaf O(D) (which corresponds to a line bundle) such that the linear system of D is more or less the space of sections of O(D). For curves the Todd class is $1+c_1(T(X))/2,$ and the Chern character of a sheaf O(D) is just 1+c_{1}(O(D)), so the Hirzebruch–Riemann–Roch theorem states that

$h^0(\mathcal{O}(D)) - h^1(\mathcal{O}(D)) = c_1(\mathcal{O}(D)) +c_1(T(X))/2\ \ \$ (integrated over X).

But h^{0}(O(D)) is just l(D), the dimension of the linear system of D, and by Serre duality h^{1}(O(D)) = h^{0}(O(K − D)) = l(K − D) where K is the canonical divisor. Moreover, c_{1}(O(D)) integrated over X is the degree of D, and c_{1}(T(X)) integrated over X is the Euler class 2 − 2g of the curve X, where g is the genus. So we get the classical Riemann Roch theorem

$$\ell(D)-\ell(K-D) = \text{deg}(D)+1-g.$$

For vector bundles V, the Chern character is rank(V) + c_{1}(V), so we get Weil's Riemann Roch theorem for vector bundles over curves:

$$h^0(V) - h^1(V) = c_1(V) + \operatorname{rank}(V)(1-g).$$

== Riemann Roch theorem for surfaces ==
For surfaces, the Hirzebruch–Riemann–Roch theorem is essentially the Riemann–Roch theorem for surfaces

$$\chi(D) = \chi(\mathcal{O}) + ((D.D)-(D.K))/2.$$

combined with the Noether formula.

If we want, we can use Serre duality to express h^{2}(O(D)) as h^{0}(O(K − D)), but unlike the case of curves there is in general no easy way to write the h^{1}(O(D)) term in a form not involving sheaf cohomology (although in practice it often vanishes).

== Asymptotic Riemann–Roch ==
Let D be a Cartier divisor on an irreducible projective variety X of dimension n. Then

$$\chi \left (X,\mathcal O_X(mD) \right )=\frac{(D^n)}{n!}.m^n+O(m^{n-1}).$$

More generally, if $\mathcal F$ is any coherent sheaf on X then

$$\chi \left (X,\mathcal F\otimes \mathcal O_X(mD) \right )=\operatorname{rank}(\mathcal F)\frac{(D^n)}{n!}.m^n+O(m^{n-1}).$$

Moreover, if D is ample, then Serre vanishing implies that

$$h^0 \left (X,\mathcal F\otimes \mathcal O_X(mD) \right )=\operatorname{rank}(\mathcal F)\frac{(D^n)}{n!}.m^n+O(m^{n-1}).$$

== See also ==
- Grothendieck–Riemann–Roch theorem - contains many computations and examples
- Hilbert polynomial - HRR can be used to compute Hilbert polynomials

== Literature ==
- Friedrich Hirzebruch,Topological Methods in Algebraic Geometry ISBN 3-540-58663-6
- Huybrechts, Daniel (2004-11-18). Complex geometry: An introduction. Universitext. Springer Science+Business Media. ISBN 978-3540212904.
- Lazarsfeld, Robert (2004). Positivity in algebraic geometry, Vol. I. Berlin: Springer. ISBN 3-540-22533-1.
