= Noether inequality =

In mathematics, the Noether inequality, named after Max Noether, is a property of compact minimal complex surfaces that restricts the topological type of the underlying topological 4-manifold. It holds more generally for minimal projective surfaces of general type over an algebraically closed field.

== Formulation of the inequality ==
Let X be a smooth minimal projective surface of general type defined over an algebraically closed field (or a smooth minimal compact complex surface of general type) with canonical divisor K = −c_{1}(X), and let p_{g} = h^{0}(K) be the dimension of the space of holomorphic two forms, then

$$p_g \le \frac{1}{2} c_1(X)^2 + 2.$$

For complex surfaces, an alternative formulation expresses this inequality in terms of topological invariants of the underlying real oriented four manifold. Since a surface of general type is a Kähler surface, the dimension of the maximal positive subspace in intersection form on the second cohomology is given by b_{+} = 1 + 2p_{g}. Moreover, by the Hirzebruch signature theorem c_{1}^{2} (X) = 2e + 3σ, where e = c_{2}(X) is the topological Euler characteristic and σ = b_{+} − b_{−} is the signature of the intersection form. Therefore, the Noether inequality can also be expressed as

$$b_+ \le 2 e + 3 \sigma + 5$$

or equivalently using e = 2 – 2 b_{1} + b_{+} + b_{−}

$$b_- + 4 b_1 \le 4b_+  + 9.$$

Combining the Noether inequality with the Noether formula 12χ=c_{1}^{2}+c_{2} gives

$$5 c_1(X)^2 - c_2(X) + 36 \ge 12q$$

where q is the irregularity of a surface, which leads to a slightly weaker inequality, which is also often called the Noether inequality:

$$5 c_1(X)^2 - c_2(X) + 36 \ge 0 \quad (c_1^2(X)\text{ even})$$
$$5 c_1(X)^2 - c_2(X) + 30 \ge 0 \quad (c_1^2(X)\text{ odd}).$$

Surfaces where equality holds (i.e. on the Noether line) are called Horikawa surfaces.

== Proof sketch ==
It follows from the minimal general type condition that K^{2} > 0. We may thus assume that p_{g} > 1, since the inequality is otherwise automatic. In particular, we may assume there is an effective divisor D representing K. We then have an exact sequence

$$0 \to H^0(\mathcal{O}_X) \to H^0(K) \to H^0( K|_D) \to H^1(\mathcal{O}_X) \to$$

so $p_g - 1 \le h^0(K|_D).$

Assume that D is smooth. By the adjunction formula D has a canonical linebundle $\mathcal{O}_D(2K)$, therefore $K|_D$ is a special divisor and the Clifford inequality applies, which gives

$$h^0(K|_D) - 1 \le \frac{1}{2} \deg_D(K) = \frac{1}{2} K^2.$$

In general, essentially the same argument applies using a more general version of the Clifford inequality for local complete intersections with a dualising line bundle and 1-dimensional sections in the trivial line bundle. These conditions are satisfied for the curve D by the adjunction formula and the fact that D is numerically connected.
