= Alexander von Brill =

German mathematician (1842–1935)

- Born: Alexander Wilhelm Brill; 20 September 1842; Darmstadt, Grand Duchy of Hesse
- Died: 18 June 1935 (aged 92); Tübingen, Germany
- Education: University of Giessen
- Scientific career
- Fields: Mathematics
- Workplaces: University of Tübingen
- Doctoral advisor: Alfred Clebsch
- Doctoral students: Sebastian Finsterwalder; Max Planck

Alexander von Brill (born Alexander Wilhelm Brill; 20 September 1842 – 18 June 1935) was a German mathematician.

== Biography ==
Born in Darmstadt, Hesse, Brill was educated at the University of Giessen, where he earned his doctorate under supervision of Alfred Clebsch. He held a chair at the University of Tübingen, where Max Planck was among his students.

In 1874, Max Noether and von Brill introduced the study of special divisors known as Brill–Noether theory.

In 1933, he joined the National Socialist Teachers League as one of the first members from Tübingen.

== Legacy ==
The London Science Museum contains sliceform objects prepared by Brill and Felix Klein.

== Selected publications ==
- von Brill, Alexander; Noether, Max (1874). "Ueber die algebraischen Functionen und ihre Anwendung in der Geometrie". Mathematische Annalen. 7 (2): 269–316. doi:10.1007/BF02104804. JFM 06.0251.01. S2CID 120777748.
- Vorlesungen über ebene algebraische Kurven und Funktionen. 1925.
- Vorlesungen über allgemeine Mechanik. 1928.
- Vorlesungen zur Einführung in die Mechanik raumerfüllender Massen. 1909.
- Graphische Darstellungen aus der reinen und angewandten Mathematik. 1894.
- with Max Noether: Über algebraische Funktionen und ihre Anwendung in der Geometrie. Mitt. Göttinger Akad.1873, and their article with the same name in the Mathematischen Annalen Bd.7, 1874, Online
- with Max Noether: Die Entwicklung der Theorie der algebraischen Funktionen in älterer und neuerer Zeit. Jahresbericht DMV 1894.
- Das Relativitätsprinzip. Teubner 1912.
- Über Kepler's Astronomia nova. Stuttgart 1930. (15 pp.)

== See also ==
- Brill–Noether theory
- Chasles–Cayley–Brill formula
- Discriminant of an algebraic number field
