= Clifford's theorem on special divisors =

Theorem in algebraic geometry

In mathematics, Clifford's theorem on special divisors is a result of William K. Clifford (1878) on algebraic curves, showing the constraints on special linear systems on a curve C.

== Statement ==
A divisor on a Riemann surface C is a formal sum $\textstyle D = \sum_P m_P P$ of points P on C with integer coefficients. One considers a divisor as a set of constraints on meromorphic functions in the function field of C, defining $L(D)$ as the vector space of functions having poles only at points of D with positive coefficient, at most as bad as the coefficient indicates, and having zeros at points of D with negative coefficient, with at least that multiplicity. The dimension of $L(D)$ is finite, and denoted $\ell(D)$. The linear system of divisors attached to D is the corresponding projective space of dimension $\ell(D)-1$.

The other significant invariant of D is its degree d, which is the sum of all its coefficients.

A divisor is called special if ℓ(K − D) > 0, where K is the canonical divisor.

Clifford's theorem states that for an effective special divisor D, one has:

$$2(\ell(D)- 1) \le d$$,

and that equality holds only if D is zero or a canonical divisor, or if C is a hyperelliptic curve and D linearly equivalent to an integral multiple of a hyperelliptic divisor.

The Clifford index of C is then defined as the minimum of $d - 2(\ell(D) - 1)$ taken over all special divisors (except canonical and trivial), and Clifford's theorem states this is non-negative. It can be shown that the Clifford index for a generic curve of genus g is equal to the floor function $\lfloor\tfrac{g-1}{2}\rfloor.$

The Clifford index measures how far the curve is from being hyperelliptic. It may be thought of as a refinement of the gonality: in many cases the Clifford index is equal to the gonality minus 2.

== Green's conjecture ==
A conjecture of Mark Green states that the Clifford index for a curve over the complex numbers that is not hyperelliptic should be determined by the extent to which C as canonical curve has linear syzygies. In detail, one defines the invariant a(C) in terms of the minimal free resolution of the homogeneous coordinate ring of C in its canonical embedding, as the largest index i for which the graded Betti number β_{i, i + 2} is zero. Green and Robert Lazarsfeld showed that a(C) + 1 is a lower bound for the Clifford index, and Green's conjecture states that equality always holds. There are numerous partial results.

Claire Voisin was awarded the Ruth Lyttle Satter Prize in Mathematics for her solution of the generic case of Green's conjecture in two papers. The case of Green's conjecture for generic curves had attracted a huge amount of effort by algebraic geometers over twenty years before finally being laid to rest by Voisin. The conjecture for arbitrary curves remains open.
