= Gustav Roch =

German mathematician

Gustav A. Roch
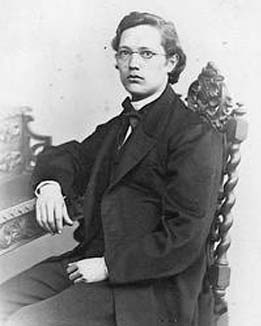
- Gustav Roch (1839-1866)
- Born: 9 December 1839; Leipzig, Saxony
- Died: 21 November 1866 (aged 26); Venice, Italy
- Known for: Riemann–Roch theorem
- Scientific career
- Fields: Mathematics

Gustav Adolph Roch (German: [ʀɔχ]; 9 December 1839 – 21 November 1866) was a German mathematician who made significant contributions to the theory of Riemann surfaces. Roch’s career was cut short by his untimely death at the age of 26.

== Biography ==
Born in Leipzig, Roch attended the Polytechnic Institute (Technische Bildungsanstalt) in Dresden, initially focusing on chemistry, encouraged by his father. However the mathematician Oscar Schlömilch identified his exceptional talents and guided him towards a mathematical career. Combining studies at the Polytechnic Institute with private studies at another institute enabled Roch to be already publishing original research on the mathematical theory of electromagnetism from 1859.

Later in 1859, Roch entered the University of Leipzig, coming under the influence of August Ferdinand Möbius, and continuing his work on electromagnetism. In 1861, Roch went to work at the University of Göttingen, studying under Wilhelm Eduard Weber, but also attending lectures by Bernhard Riemann. After three terms in Göttingen, Roch went to the University of Berlin, where he met Leopold Kronecker, Karl Weierstrass and others. In 1862 he was awarded a magister artium degree from Leipzig and later a doctorate for his work on electromagnetism.

From this point his work took a more mathematical slant. In the following year he published the paper containing the result for which he is famous to this day, the Riemann–Roch theorem (given its name by Max Noether), which related the topological genus of a Riemann surface to purely algebraic properties.

Only two years later, Roch's health was shattered due to a tuberculosis infection. He moved to Venice in the hope that warmer weather would aid his recovery, but died there a month later. This loss came only four months after that of his former professor and mentor Bernhard Riemann.
