= AF+BG theorem =

About algebraic curves passing through all intersection points of two other curves

In algebraic geometry the AF+BG theorem (also known as Max Noether's fundamental theorem) is a result of Max Noether that asserts that, if the equation of an algebraic curve in the complex projective plane belongs locally (at each intersection point) to the ideal generated by the equations of two other algebraic curves, then it belongs globally to this ideal.

== Statement ==
Let F, G, and H be homogeneous polynomials in three variables, with H having higher degree than F and G; let a = deg H − deg F and b = deg H − deg G (both positive integers) be the differences of the degrees of the polynomials. Suppose that the greatest common divisor of F and G is a constant, which means that the projective curves that they define in the projective plane $\mathbb P^2$ have an intersection consisting in a finite number of points. For each point P of this intersection, the polynomials F and G generate an ideal (F, G)_{P} of the local ring of $\mathbb P^2$ at P (this local ring is the ring of the fractions $\tfrac n d,$ where n and d are polynomials in three variables and d(P) ≠ 0). The theorem asserts that, if H lies in (F, G)_{P} for every intersection point P, then H lies in the ideal (F, G); that is, there are homogeneous polynomials A and B of degrees a and b, respectively, such that H = AF + BG. Furthermore, any two choices of A differ by a multiple of G, and similarly any two choices of B differ by a multiple of F.

== Related results ==
This theorem may be viewed as a generalization of Bézout's identity, which provides a condition under which an integer or a univariate polynomial h may be expressed as an element of the ideal generated by two other integers or univariate polynomials f and g: such a representation exists exactly when h is a multiple of the greatest common divisor of f and g. The AF+BG condition expresses, in terms of divisors (sets of points, with multiplicities), a similar condition under which a homogeneous polynomial H in three variables can be written as an element of the ideal generated by two other polynomials F and G.

This theorem is also a refinement, for this particular case, of Hilbert's Nullstellensatz, which provides a condition expressing that some power of a polynomial h (in any number of variables) belongs to the ideal generated by a finite set of polynomials.
