= Multiplicative sequence =

Concept in mathematics

In mathematics, a multiplicative sequence or m-sequence is a sequence of polynomials associated with a formal group structure. They have application in the cobordism ring in algebraic topology.

== Definition ==
Let K_{n} be polynomials over a ring A in indeterminates p_{1}, ... weighted so that p_{i} has weight i (with p_{0} = 1) and all the terms in K_{n} have weight n (in particular K_{n} is a polynomial in p_{1}, ..., p_{n}). The sequence K_{n} is multiplicative if the map

$$K: \sum_{n = 0}^\infty q_nz^n\mapsto \sum_{n=0}^\infty K_n(q_1,\cdots, q_n)z^n$$

is an endomorphism of the multiplicative monoid $(A[x_1, x_2,\cdots][[z]],\cdot)$, where $q_n\in A[x_1, x_2,\cdots]$.

The power series

$$K(1+z) = \sum K_n(1,0,\ldots,0) z^n$$

is the characteristic power series of the K_{n}. A multiplicative sequence is determined by its characteristic power series Q(z), and every power series with constant term 1 gives rise to a multiplicative sequence.

To recover a multiplicative sequence from a characteristic power series Q(z) we consider the coefficient of z^{j} in the product

$$\prod_{i=1}^m Q(\beta_i z) \$$

for any m > j. This is symmetric in the β_{i} and homogeneous of weight j: so can be expressed as a polynomial K_{j}(p_{1}, ..., p_{j}) in the elementary symmetric functions p of the β. Then K_{j} defines a multiplicative sequence.

== Examples ==
As an example, the sequence K_{n} = p_{n} is multiplicative and has characteristic power series 1 + z.

Consider the power series

$$Q(z) = \frac{\sqrt z}{\tanh \sqrt z} = 1 - \sum_{k=1}^\infty (-1)^k \frac{2^{2k}}{(2k)!} B_k z^k \$$

where B_{k} is the k-th Bernoulli number. The multiplicative sequence with Q as characteristic power series is denoted L_{j}(p_{1}, ..., p_{j}).

The multiplicative sequence with characteristic power series

$$Q(z) = \frac{2\sqrt z}{\sinh 2\sqrt z} \$$

is denoted A_{j}(p_{1},...,p_{j}).

The multiplicative sequence with characteristic power series

$$Q(z) = \frac{z}{1-\exp(-z)}  = 1 + \frac{x}{2} - \sum_{k=1}^\infty (-1)^k \frac{B_k}{(2k)!} z^{2k} \$$

is denoted T_{j}(p_{1},...,p_{j}): these are the Todd polynomials.

== Genus ==
The genus of a multiplicative sequence is a ring homomorphism, from the cobordism ring of smooth oriented compact manifolds to another ring, usually the ring of rational numbers.

For example, the Todd genus is associated to the Todd polynomials with characteristic power series $\frac{z}{1-\exp(-z)}$.
