= Grothendieck–Riemann–Roch theorem =

Result in algebraic geometry

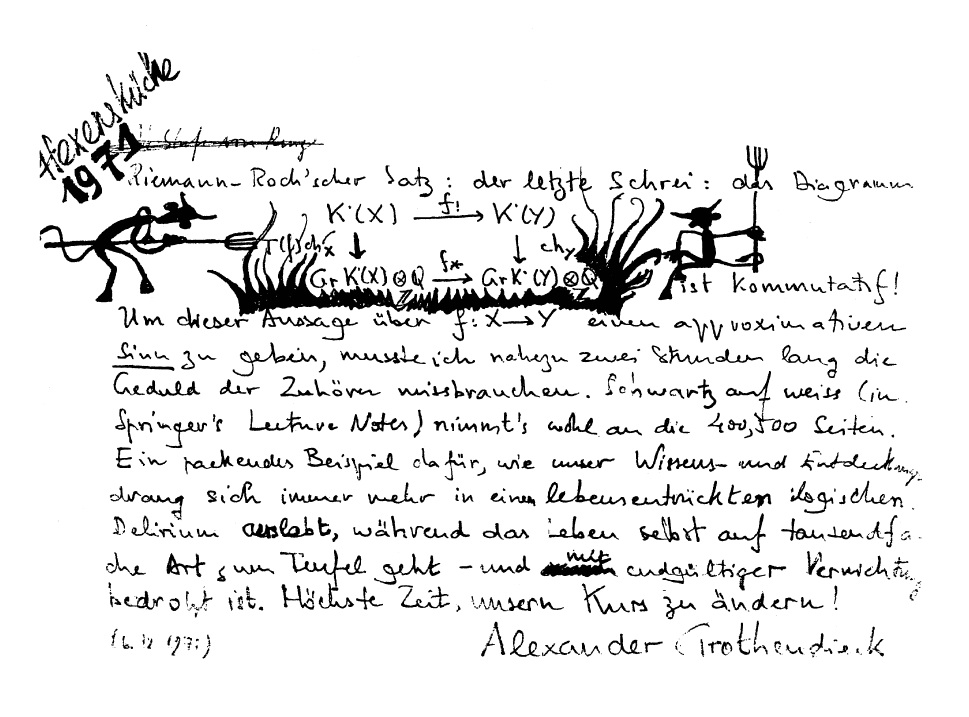
- Grothendieck's comment on the Grothendieck–Riemann–Roch theorem on the lecture book of the Mathematical Institute in Bielefeld
- Field: Algebraic geometry
- First proof by: Alexander Grothendieck
- First proof in: 1957
- Generalizations: Atiyah–Singer index theorem
- Consequences: Hirzebruch–Riemann–Roch theorem Riemann–Roch theorem for surfaces Riemann–Roch theorem

In mathematics, specifically in algebraic geometry, the Grothendieck–Riemann–Roch theorem is a far-reaching result on coherent cohomology. It is a generalisation of the Hirzebruch–Riemann–Roch theorem, about complex manifolds, which is itself a generalisation of the classical Riemann–Roch theorem for line bundles on compact Riemann surfaces.

Riemann–Roch type theorems relate Euler characteristics of the cohomology of a vector bundle with their topological degrees, or more generally their characteristic classes in (co)homology or algebraic analogues thereof. The classical Riemann–Roch theorem does this for curves and line bundles, whereas the Hirzebruch–Riemann–Roch theorem generalises this to vector bundles over manifolds. The Grothendieck–Riemann–Roch theorem sets both theorems in a relative situation of a morphism between two manifolds (or more general schemes) and changes the theorem from a statement about a single bundle, to one applying to chain complexes of sheaves.

The theorem has been very influential, not least for the development of the Atiyah–Singer index theorem. Conversely, complex analytic analogues of the Grothendieck–Riemann–Roch theorem can be proved using the index theorem for families. Alexander Grothendieck gave a first proof in a 1957 manuscript, later published. Armand Borel and Jean-Pierre Serre wrote up and published Grothendieck's proof in 1958. Later, Grothendieck and his collaborators simplified and generalized the proof.

== Formulation ==
Let X be a smooth quasi-projective scheme over a field. Under these assumptions, the Grothendieck group $K_0(X)$ of bounded complexes of coherent sheaves is canonically isomorphic to the Grothendieck group of bounded complexes of finite-rank vector bundles. Using this isomorphism, consider the Chern character (a rational combination of Chern classes) as a functorial transformation:

$$\mathrm{ch} \colon K_0(X) \to A(X, \Q),$$

where $A_d(X,\Q)$ is the Chow group of cycles on X of dimension d modulo rational equivalence, tensored with the rational numbers. In case X is defined over the complex numbers, the latter group maps to the topological cohomology group:

$$H^{2\dim(X) - 2d}(X, \Q).$$

Now consider a proper morphism $f \colon X \to Y$ between smooth quasi-projective schemes and a bounded complex of sheaves ${\mathcal F^\bull}$ on $X.$

The Grothendieck–Riemann–Roch theorem relates the pushforward map

$$f_{!} = \sum (-1)^i R^i f_* \colon K_0(X) \to K_0(Y)$$

(alternating sum of higher direct images) and the pushforward

$$f_* \colon A(X) \to A(Y),$$

by the formula

$$\mathrm{ch} (f_{!}{\mathcal F}^\bull) \mathrm{td}(Y) = f_* (\mathrm{ch}({\mathcal F}^\bull) \mathrm{td}(X) ).$$

Here $\mathrm{td}(X)$ is the Todd genus of (the tangent bundle of) X. Thus the theorem gives a precise measure for the lack of commutativity of taking the push forwards in the above senses and the Chern character and shows that the needed correction factors depend on X and Y only. In fact, since the Todd genus is functorial and multiplicative in exact sequences, we can rewrite the Grothendieck–Riemann–Roch formula as

$$\mathrm{ch}(f_{!}{\mathcal F}^\bull) = f_* (\mathrm{ch}({\mathcal F}^\bull) \mathrm{td}(T_f) ),$$

where $T_f$ is the relative tangent sheaf of f, defined as the element $TX - f^*(TY)$ in $K_0(X)$. For example, when f is a smooth morphism, $T_f$ is simply a vector bundle, known as the tangent bundle along the fibers of f.

Using A^{1}-homotopy theory, the Grothendieck–Riemann–Roch theorem has been extended by Navarro & Navarro (2017) to the situation where f is a proper map between two smooth schemes.

== Generalising and specialising ==
Generalisations of the theorem can be made to the non-smooth case by considering an appropriate generalisation of the combination $\mathrm{ch}(-)\mathrm{td}(X)$ and to the non-proper case by considering cohomology with compact support.

The arithmetic Riemann–Roch theorem extends the Grothendieck–Riemann–Roch theorem to arithmetic schemes.

The Hirzebruch–Riemann–Roch theorem is (essentially) the special case where Y is a point and the field is the field of complex numbers.

A version of Riemann–Roch theorem for oriented cohomology theories was proven by Ivan Panin and Alexander Smirnov. It is concerned with multiplicative operations between algebraic oriented cohomology theories (such as algebraic cobordism). The Grothendieck-Riemann-Roch is a particular case of this result, and the Chern character comes up naturally in this setting.

== Examples ==
=== Vector bundles on a curve ===
A vector bundle $E \to C$ of rank $n$ and degree $d$ (defined as the degree of its determinant; or equivalently the degree of its first Chern class) on a smooth projective curve over a field $k$ has a formula similar to Riemann–Roch for line bundles. If we take $X = C$ and $Y = \{*\}$ a point, then the Grothendieck–Riemann–Roch formula can be read as

$$\begin{align}
\mathrm{ch}(f_{!}E) &= h^0(C,E) - h^1(C,E) \\
f_*(\mathrm{ch}(E)\mathrm{td}(X))&= f_*((n + c_1(E))(1 + (1/2)c_1(T_C))) \\
&= f_*(n + c_1(E) + (n/2)c_1(T_C)) \\
&= f_*(c_1(E) + (n/2)c_1(T_C)) \\
&= d + n(1-g);
\end{align}$$

hence,

$\chi(C,E) = d + n(1-g).$

This formula also holds for coherent sheaves of rank $n$ and degree $d$.

=== Smooth proper maps ===
One of the advantages of the Grothendieck–Riemann–Roch formula is it can be interpreted as a relative version of the Hirzebruch–Riemann–Roch formula. For example, a smooth morphism $f\colon X \to Y$ has fibers which are all equi-dimensional (and isomorphic as topological spaces when base changing to $\Complex$). This fact is useful in moduli-theory when considering a moduli space $\mathcal{M}$ parameterizing smooth proper spaces. For example, David Mumford used this formula to deduce relationships of the Chow ring on the moduli space of algebraic curves.

==== Moduli of curves ====
For the moduli stack of genus $g$ curves (and no marked points) $\overline{\mathcal{M}}_g$ there is a universal curve $\pi\colon\overline{\mathcal{C}}_g \to \overline{\mathcal{M}}_g$ where $\overline{\mathcal{C}}_g = \overline{\mathcal{M}}_{g,1}$ is the moduli stack of curves of genus $g$ and one marked point. Then, he defines the tautological classes

$$\begin{align}
K_{\overline{\mathcal{C}}_g/\overline{\mathcal{M}}_g} &= c_1(\omega_{\overline{\mathcal{C}}_g/\overline{\mathcal{M}}_g})\\
\kappa_l &= \pi_*(K^{l+1}_{\overline{\mathcal{C}}_g/\overline{\mathcal{M}}_g}) \\
\mathbb{E} &= \pi_*(\omega_{\overline{\mathcal{C}}_g/\overline{\mathcal{M}}_g}) \\
\lambda_l &= c_l(\mathbb{E})
\end{align}$$

where $1 \leq l \leq g$ and $\omega_{\overline{\mathcal{C}}_g/\overline{\mathcal{M}}_g}$ is the relative dualizing sheaf. Note the fiber of $\omega_{\overline{\mathcal{C}}_g/\overline{\mathcal{M}}_g}$over a point $[C] \in \overline{\mathcal{M}}_g$ this is the dualizing sheaf $\omega_C$. He was able to find relations between the $\lambda_i$ and $\kappa_i$ describing the $\lambda_i$ in terms of a sum of $\kappa_i$ (corollary 6.2) on the chow ring $A^*(\mathcal{M}_g)$ of the smooth locus using Grothendieck–Riemann–Roch. Because $\overline{\mathcal{M}}_g$ is a smooth Deligne–Mumford stack, he considered a covering by a scheme $\tilde{\mathcal{M}}_g \to \overline{\mathcal{M}}_g$ which presents $\overline{\mathcal{M}}_g = [\tilde{\mathcal{M}}_g/G]$ for some finite group $G$. He uses Grothendieck–Riemann–Roch on $\omega_{\tilde{\mathcal{C}}_g/\tilde{\mathcal{M}}_g}$ to get

$$\mathrm{ch}(\pi_!(\omega_{\tilde{\mathcal{C}}/\tilde{\mathcal{M}}})) = \pi_*(\mathrm{ch}(\omega_{\tilde{\mathcal{C}}/ \tilde{\mathcal{M}}}) \mathrm{Td}^\vee(\Omega^1_{\tilde{\mathcal{C}}/\tilde{\mathcal{M}}}))$$

Because

$$\mathbf{R}^1\pi_!({\omega _{{\tilde {\mathcal {C}}}_{g}/{\tilde {\mathcal {M}}}_{g}}}) \cong \mathcal{O}_{\tilde{M}},$$

this gives the formula

$$\mathrm{ch}(\mathbb{E}) = 1 + \pi_*(\text{ch}(\omega_{\tilde{\mathcal{C}}/\tilde{\mathcal{M}}}) \text{Td}^\vee (\Omega^1_{\tilde{\mathcal{C}}/\tilde{\mathcal{M}}})).$$

The computation of $\mathrm{ch}(\mathbb{E})$ can then be reduced even further. In even dimensions $2k$,

$$\text{ch}(\mathbb{E})_{2k} = 0.$$

Also, on dimension 1,

$$\lambda_1 = c_1(\mathbb{E}) = \frac{1}{12}(\kappa_1 + \delta),$$

where $\delta$ is a class on the boundary. In the case $g=2$ and on the smooth locus $\mathcal{M}_g$ there are the relations

$$\begin{align}
\lambda_1 &= \frac{1}{12}\kappa_1 \\
\lambda_2 &= \frac{\lambda_1^2}{2} = \frac{\kappa_1^2}{288}
\end{align}$$

which can be deduced by analyzing the Chern character of $\mathbb{E}$.

=== Closed embedding ===
Closed embeddings $f\colon Y \to X$ have a description using the Grothendieck–Riemann–Roch formula as well, showing another non-trivial case where the formula holds. For a smooth variety $X$ of dimension $n$ and a subvariety $Y$ of codimension $k$, there is the formula

$$c_k(\mathcal{O}_Y) = (-1)^{k-1}(k-1)![Y]$$

Using the short exact sequence

$$0 \to \mathcal{I}_Y \to \mathcal{O}_X \to \mathcal{O}_Y \to 0$$,

there is the formula

$$c_k(\mathcal{I}_Y) = (-1)^k(k-1)![Y]$$

for the ideal sheaf since $1 = c(\mathcal{O}_X) = c(\mathcal{O}_Y)c(\mathcal{I}_Y)$.

== Applications ==
=== Quasi-projectivity of moduli spaces ===
Grothendieck–Riemann–Roch can be used in proving that a coarse moduli space $M$, such as the moduli space of pointed algebraic curves $M_{g,n}$, admits an embedding into a projective space, hence is a quasi-projective variety. This can be accomplished by looking at canonically associated sheaves on $M$ and studying the degree of associated line bundles. For instance, $M_{g,n}$ has the family of curves

$$\pi\colon C_{g,n} \to M_{g,n}$$

with sections

$$s_i\colon M_{g,n} \to C_{g,n}$$

corresponding to the marked points. Since each fiber has the canonical bundle $\omega_{C}$, there are the associated line bundles
$$\Lambda_{g,n}(\pi) = \det(\mathbf{R}\pi_*(\omega_{C_{g,n}/M_{g,n}}))$$
and
$$\chi_{g,n}^{(i)} = s_i^*(\omega_{C_{g,n}/M_{g,n}}) .$$
It turns out that

$$\Lambda_{g,n}(\pi) \otimes \left(\bigotimes_{i=1}^n \chi_{g,n}^{(i)}\right)$$

is an ample line bundle^{pg 209}, hence the coarse moduli space $M_{g,n}$ is quasi-projective.

== History ==
Alexander Grothendieck's version of the Riemann–Roch theorem was originally conveyed in a letter to Jean-Pierre Serre around 1956–1957. It was made public at the initial Bonn Arbeitstagung, in 1957. Serre and Armand Borel subsequently organized a seminar at Princeton University to understand it. The final published paper was in effect the Borel–Serre exposition.

The significance of Grothendieck's approach rests on several points. First, Grothendieck changed the statement itself: the theorem was, at the time, understood to be a theorem about a variety, whereas Grothendieck saw it as a theorem about a morphism between varieties. By finding the right generalization, the proof became simpler while the conclusion became more general. In short, Grothendieck applied a strong categorical approach to a hard piece of analysis. Moreover, Grothendieck introduced K-groups, as discussed above, which paved the way for algebraic K-theory.

== See also ==
- Kawasaki's Riemann–Roch formula
