= Richard Baldus =

German mathematician

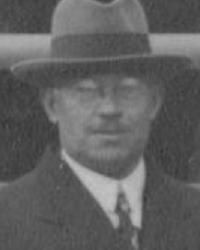
Richard Baldus, 1930 in Jena

Richard Baldus (11 May 1885, in Salonika – 28 January 1945, in Munich) was a German mathematician, specializing in geometry.

Richard Baldus was the son of a station chief of the Anatolian Railway. After his graduation (Abitur) in 1904 at Wilhelmsgymnasium München, he studied at the Ludwig-Maximilians-Universität München and at the University of Erlangen, where he received his Ph.D. (Promotierung) in 1910 under Max Noether with thesis Über Strahlensysteme, welche unendlich viele Regelflächen 2. Grades enthalten and where he received his Habilitierung in 1911. He became in 1919 Professor für Geometrie at the Technische Hochschule Karlsruhe and served there as rector from 1923 to 1924. In 1932, he became Professor für Geometrie (as successor to Sebastian Finsterwalder) at the Technical University of Munich, where in 1934 he also became the successor to the professorial chair of Walther von Dyck, upon the latter's retirement.

In 1933, Baldus was the president of the Deutsche Mathematiker-Vereinigung. He was an invited speaker at the International Congress of Mathematicians in 1928 at Bologna. He was elected in 1929 a member of the Heidelberger Akademie der Wissenschaften and in 1935 a member of the Bayerische Akademie der Wissenschaften.

== Selected publications ==
- Über Strahlensysteme, welche unendlich viele Regelflächen 2. Grades enthalten. Erlangen: Junge & Sohn. 1910.
- "Mathematik und räumliche Anschauung". Jahresbericht der Deutschen Mathematiker-Vereinigung. 30: 1–15. 1921.
- Baldus, Richard (1923). "Zur Steinerschen Definition der Projektivität". Mathematische Annalen. 90 (1): 86–102. doi:10.1007/BF01456243. S2CID 121669489.
- Formalismus und Intuitionismus in der Mathematik. Karlsruhe: G. Braun. 1924.
- Nichteuklidische Geometrie - hyperbolische Geometrie der Ebene. Sammlung Göschen, de Gruyter. 1927.
- Zur Klassifikation der ebenen und räumlichen Kollineationen. Verlag d. Bayer. Akademie d. Wissenschaften. 1928.
- Baldus, Richard (1928). "Zur Axiomatik der Geometrie. I". Mathematische Annalen. 100: 321–333. doi:10.1007/BF01448848. S2CID 124779504.
- "Zur Axiomatik der Geometrie II. Vereinfachungen des archimedischen und cantorschen Axioms" (PDF). Atti del Congresso Internazionale die Mathematici. 1928.
- Zur Axiomatik der Geometrie. III. Über das Archimedische und das Cantorsche Axiom. Verlag der Bayer. Akad. der Wiss. 1930.
