= Arithmetic genus =

Property of an algebraic variety

In mathematics, the arithmetic genus of an algebraic variety is one of a few possible generalizations of the genus of an algebraic curve or Riemann surface.

== Projective varieties ==
Let X be a projective scheme of dimension r over a field k, the arithmetic genus $p_a$ of X is defined as
$$p_a(X)=(-1)^r (\chi(\mathcal{O}_X)-1).$$
Here $\chi(\mathcal{O}_X)$ is the Euler characteristic of the structure sheaf $\mathcal{O}_X$.

== Complex projective manifolds ==
The arithmetic genus of a complex projective manifold of dimension n can be defined as a combination of Hodge numbers, namely

$$p_a=\sum_{j=0}^{n-1} (-1)^j h^{n-j,0}.$$

When n=1, the formula becomes $p_a=h^{1,0}$. According to the Hodge theorem, $h^{0,1}=h^{1,0}$. Consequently $h^{0,1}=h^1(X)/2=g$, where g is the usual (topological) meaning of genus of a surface, so the definitions are compatible.

When X is a compact Kähler manifold, applying h^{p,q} = h^{q,p} recovers the earlier definition for projective varieties.

== Kähler manifolds ==
By using h^{p,q} = h^{q,p} for compact Kähler manifolds this can be reformulated as the Euler characteristic in coherent cohomology for the structure sheaf $\mathcal{O}_M$:

$$p_a=(-1)^n(\chi(\mathcal{O}_M)-1).\,$$

This definition therefore can be applied to some other locally ringed spaces.

== See also ==
- Genus (mathematics)
- Geometric genus
