= Noether's theorem on rationality for surfaces =

Theorem

In mathematics, Noether's theorem on rationality for surfaces is a classical result of Max Noether on complex algebraic surfaces, giving a criterion for a rational surface. Let S be an algebraic surface that is non-singular and projective. Suppose there is a morphism φ from S to the projective line, with general fibre also a projective line. Then the theorem states that S is rational.

== See also ==
- Hirzebruch surface
- List of complex and algebraic surfaces
