= Brill–Noether theory =

Field of algebraic geometry

In algebraic geometry, Brill–Noether theory, introduced by Alexander von Brill and Max Noether (1874), is the study of special divisors, certain divisors on a curve C that determine more compatible functions than would be predicted. In classical language, special divisors move on the curve in a "larger than expected" linear system of divisors.

Throughout, we consider a projective smooth curve over the complex numbers (or over some other algebraically closed field).

The condition to be a special divisor D can be formulated in sheaf cohomology terms, as the non-vanishing of the H^{1} cohomology of the sheaf of sections of the invertible sheaf or line bundle associated to D. This means that, by the Riemann–Roch theorem, the H^{0} cohomology or space of holomorphic sections is larger than expected.

Alternatively, by Serre duality, the condition is that there exist holomorphic differentials with divisor ≥ –D on the curve.

== Main theorems of Brill–Noether theory ==
For a given genus g, the moduli space for curves C of genus g should contain a dense subset parameterizing those curves with the minimum in the way of special divisors. One goal of the theory is to 'count constants', for those curves: to predict the dimension of the space of special divisors (up to linear equivalence) of a given degree d, as a function of g, that must be present on a curve of that genus.

The basic statement can be formulated in terms of the Picard variety Pic(C) of a smooth curve C, and the subset of Pic(C) corresponding to divisor classes of divisors D, with given values d of deg(D) and r of l(D) – 1 in the notation of the Riemann–Roch theorem. There is a lower bound ρ for the dimension dim(d, r, g) of this subscheme in Pic(C):

$$\dim(d,r,g) \geq \rho = g-(r+1)(g-d+r)$$

called the Brill–Noether number. The formula can be memorized via the mnemonic (using our desired $h^0(D) = r+1$ and Riemann-Roch)

$$g-(r+1)(g-d+r) = g - h^0(D)h^1(D)$$

For smooth curves C and for d ≥ 1, r ≥ 0 the basic results about the space $G^r_d$ of linear systems on C of degree d and dimension r are as follows.

- George Kempf proved that if ρ ≥ 0 then $G^r_d$ is not empty, and every component has dimension at least ρ.
- William Fulton and Robert Lazarsfeld proved that if ρ ≥ 1 then $G^r_d$ is connected.
- Griffiths & Harris (1980) showed that if C is generic then $G^r_d$ is reduced and all components have dimension exactly ρ (so in particular $G^r_d$ is empty if ρ < 0).
- David Gieseker proved that if C is generic then $G^r_d$ is smooth. By the connectedness result this implies it is irreducible if ρ > 0.

Other more recent results not necessarily in terms of space $G^r_d$ of linear systems are:

- Eric Larson (2017) proved that if ρ ≥ 0, r ≥ 3, and n ≥ 1, the restriction maps $H^0(\mathcal{O}_{\mathbb{P}^r}(n))\rightarrow H^0(\mathcal{O}_{C}(n))$ are of maximal rank, also known as the maximal rank conjecture.
- Eric Larson and Isabel Vogt (2022) proved that if ρ ≥ 0 then there is a curve C interpolating through n general points in $\mathbb{P}^r$ if and only if $(r-1)n \leq (r + 1)d - (r-3)(g-1),$ except in 4 exceptional cases: (d, g, r) ∈ {(5,2,3),(6,4,3),(7,2,5),(10,6,5)}.

== Maximal rank conjecture ==
Let $C \subset$ $\mathbb{P}^r$ be a general curve of genus g embedded via a general linear series of degree d. The Maximal Rank Conjecture asserts that the restriction maps $H^0(\mathcal{O}_{\mathbb{P}^r}(m)) \to H^0(\mathcal{O}_{\mathbb{C}}(m))$ are of maximal rank; this determines the Hilbert function of $C$.

Its first proof was published by Eric Larson on 14 Nov 2017 whilst a graduate student at MIT.
