= Max Noether's theorem on curves =

In algebraic geometry, Max Noether's theorem on curves is a theorem about curves lying on algebraic surfaces, which are hypersurfaces in P^{3}, or more generally complete intersections. It states that, for degree at least four for hypersurfaces, the generic such surface has no curve on it apart from the hyperplane section. In more modern language, the Picard group is infinite cyclic, other than for a short list of degrees. This is now often called the Noether-Lefschetz theorem.
