= Divisor (algebraic geometry) =

Generalizations of codimension-1 subvarieties of algebraic varieties

In algebraic geometry, divisors are a generalization of codimension-1 subvarieties of algebraic varieties. Two different generalizations are in common use, Cartier divisors and Weil divisors (named for Pierre Cartier and André Weil by David Mumford). Both are derived from the notion of divisibility in the integers and algebraic number fields.

Globally, every codimension-1 subvariety of a projective space is defined by the vanishing of one homogeneous polynomial; by contrast, a codimension-r subvariety need not be definable by only r equations when r is greater than 1. (That is, not every subvariety of projective space is a complete intersection.) Locally, every codimension-1 subvariety of a smooth variety can be defined by one equation in a neighborhood of each point. Again, the analogous statement fails for higher-codimension subvarieties. As a result of this property, much of algebraic geometry studies an arbitrary variety by analysing its codimension-1 subvarieties and the corresponding line bundles.

On singular varieties, this property can also fail, and so one has to distinguish between codimension-1 subvarieties and varieties which can locally be defined by one equation. The former are Weil divisors while the latter are Cartier divisors.

Topologically, Weil divisors correspond to homology cycles, while Cartier divisors correspond to cohomology classes defined by line bundles. On a smooth variety (or more generally a regular scheme), a result analogous to Poincaré duality says that Weil and Cartier divisors are the same.

The name "divisor" goes back to the work of Dedekind and Weber, who showed the relevance of Dedekind domains to the study of algebraic curves. The group of divisors on a curve (the free abelian group generated by all divisors) is closely related to the group of fractional ideals for a Dedekind domain.

An algebraic cycle is a higher codimension generalization of a divisor; by definition, a Weil divisor is a cycle of codimension 1.

== Divisors on a Riemann surface ==
A Riemann surface is a 1-dimensional complex manifold, and so its codimension-1 submanifolds have dimension 0. The group of divisors on a compact Riemann surface X is the free abelian group on the points of X.

Equivalently, a divisor on a compact Riemann surface X is a finite linear combination of points of X with integer coefficients. The degree of a divisor on X is the sum of its coefficients.

For any nonzero meromorphic function f on X, one can define the order of vanishing of f at a point p in X, ord_{p}(f). It is an integer, negative if f has a pole at p. The divisor of a nonzero meromorphic function f on the compact Riemann surface X is defined as

$$(f):=\sum_{p \in X} \operatorname{ord}_p(f) p,$$

which is a finite sum. Divisors of the form (f) are also called principal divisors. Since (fg) = (f) + (g), the set of principal divisors is a subgroup of the group of divisors. Two divisors that differ by a principal divisor are called linearly equivalent.

On a compact Riemann surface, the degree of a principal divisor is zero; that is, the number of zeros of a meromorphic function is equal to the number of poles, counted with multiplicity. As a result, the degree is well-defined on linear equivalence classes of divisors.

Given a divisor D on a compact Riemann surface X, it is important to study the complex vector space of meromorphic functions on X with poles at most given by D, called H^{0}(X, O(D)) or the space of sections of the line bundle associated to D. The degree of D says a lot about the dimension of this vector space. For example, if D has negative degree, then this vector space is zero (because a meromorphic function cannot have more zeros than poles). If D has positive degree, then the dimension of H^{0}(X, O(mD)) grows linearly in m for m sufficiently large. The Riemann–Roch theorem is a more precise statement along these lines. On the other hand, the precise dimension of H^{0}(X, O(D)) for divisors D of low degree is subtle, and not completely determined by the degree of D. The distinctive features of a compact Riemann surface are reflected in these dimensions.

One key divisor on a compact Riemann surface is the canonical divisor. To define it, one first defines the divisor of a nonzero meromorphic 1-form along the lines above. Since the space of meromorphic 1-forms is a 1-dimensional vector space over the field of meromorphic functions, any two nonzero meromorphic 1-forms yield linearly equivalent divisors. Any divisor in this linear equivalence class is called the canonical divisor of X, K_{X}. The genus g of X can be read from the canonical divisor: namely, K_{X} has degree 2g − 2. The key trichotomy among compact Riemann surfaces X is whether the canonical divisor has negative degree (so X has genus zero), zero degree (genus one), or positive degree (genus at least 2). For example, this determines whether X has a Kähler metric with positive curvature, zero curvature, or negative curvature. The canonical divisor has negative degree if and only if X is isomorphic to the Riemann sphere CP^{1}.

== Weil divisors ==
Let X be an integral locally Noetherian scheme. A prime divisor or irreducible divisor on X is an integral closed subscheme Z of codimension 1 in X. A Weil divisor on X is a formal sum over the prime divisors Z of X,

$$\sum_Z n_Z Z,$$

where the collection $\{Z : n_Z \neq 0\}$ is locally finite. If X is quasi-compact (i.e., Noetherian), local finiteness is equivalent to $\{Z : n_Z \neq 0\}$ being finite. The group of all Weil divisors is denoted Div(X). A Weil divisor D is effective if all the coefficients are non-negative. One writes D ≥ D′ if the difference D − D′ is effective.

For example, a divisor on an algebraic curve over a field is a formal sum of finitely many closed points. A divisor on Spec Z is a formal sum of prime numbers with integer coefficients and therefore corresponds to a non-zero fractional ideal in Q. A similar characterization is true for divisors on $\operatorname{Spec} \mathcal{O}_K,$ where K is a number field.

If Z ⊂ X is a prime divisor, then the local ring $\mathcal{O}_{X,Z}$ has Krull dimension one. If $f \in \mathcal{O}_{X,Z}$ is non-zero, then the order of vanishing of f along Z, written ord_{Z}(f), is the length of $\mathcal{O}_{X,Z}/(f).$ This length is finite, and it is additive with respect to multiplication, that is, ord_{Z}(fg) = ord_{Z}(f) + ord_{Z}(g). If k(X) is the field of rational functions on X, then any non-zero f ∈ k(X) may be written as a quotient g / h, where g and h are in $\mathcal{O}_{X,Z},$ and the order of vanishing of f is defined to be ord_{Z}(g) − ord_{Z}(h). With this definition, the order of vanishing is a function ord_{Z} : k(X)^{×} → Z. If X is normal, then the local ring $\mathcal{O}_{X,Z}$ is a discrete valuation ring, and the function ord_{Z} is the corresponding valuation. For a non-zero rational function f on X, the principal Weil divisor associated to f is defined to be the Weil divisor

$$\operatorname{div} f = \sum_Z \operatorname{ord}_Z(f) Z.$$

It can be shown that this sum is locally finite and hence that it indeed defines a Weil divisor. The principal Weil divisor associated to f is also notated (f). If f is a regular function, then its principal Weil divisor is effective, but in general this is not true. The additivity of the order of vanishing function implies that

$$\operatorname{div} fg = \operatorname{div} f + \operatorname{div} g.$$

Consequently div is a homomorphism, and in particular its image is a subgroup of the group of all Weil divisors.

Let X be a normal integral Noetherian scheme. Every Weil divisor D determines a coherent sheaf $\mathcal{O}_X(D)$ on X. Concretely it may be defined as subsheaf of the sheaf of rational functions

$$\Gamma(U, \mathcal{O}_X(D)) = \{ f \in k(X) : f = 0 \text{ or } \operatorname{div}(f) + D \ge 0 \text{ on } U \}.$$

That is, a nonzero rational function f is a section of $\mathcal{O}_X(D)$ over U if and only if for any prime divisor Z intersecting U,

$$\operatorname{ord}_Z(f) \ge -n_Z$$

where n_{Z} is the coefficient of Z in D. If D is principal, so D is the divisor of a rational function g, then there is an isomorphism

$$\begin{cases} \mathcal{O}(D) \to \mathcal{O}_X \\ f \mapsto fg \end{cases}$$

since $\operatorname{div}(fg)$ is an effective divisor and so $fg$ is regular thanks to the normality of X. Conversely, if $\mathcal{O}(D)$ is isomorphic to $\mathcal{O}_X$ as an $\mathcal{O}_X$-module, then D is principal. It follows that D is locally principal if and only if $\mathcal{O}(D)$ is invertible; that is, a line bundle.

If D is an effective divisor that corresponds to a subscheme of X (for example D can be a reduced divisor or a prime divisor), then the ideal sheaf of the subscheme D is equal to $\mathcal{O}(-D).$This leads to an often used short exact sequence,

$$0 \to \mathcal{O}_X(-D) \to \mathcal{O}_X \to \mathcal{O}_D \to 0.$$

The sheaf cohomology of this sequence shows that $H^1(X, \mathcal{O}_X(-D))$ contains information on whether regular functions on D are the restrictions of regular functions on X.

There is also an inclusion of sheaves

$$0 \to \mathcal{O}_X \to \mathcal{O}_X(D).$$

This furnishes a canonical element of $\Gamma(X, \mathcal{O}_X(D)),$ namely, the image of the global section 1. This is called the canonical section and may be denoted s_{D}. While the canonical section is the image of a nowhere vanishing rational function, its image in $\mathcal{O}(D)$ vanishes along D because the transition functions vanish along D. When D is a smooth Cartier divisor, the cokernel of the above inclusion may be identified; see #Cartier divisors below.

Assume that X is a normal integral separated scheme of finite type over a field. Let D be a Weil divisor. Then $\mathcal{O}(D)$ is a rank one reflexive sheaf, and since $\mathcal{O}(D)$ is defined as a subsheaf of $\mathcal{M}_X,$ it is a fractional ideal sheaf (see below). Conversely, every rank one reflexive sheaf corresponds to a Weil divisor: The sheaf can be restricted to the regular locus, where it becomes free and so corresponds to a Cartier divisor (again, see below), and because the singular locus has codimension at least two, the closure of the Cartier divisor is a Weil divisor.

== Divisor class group ==
The Weil divisor class group Cl(X) is the quotient of Div(X) by the subgroup of all principal Weil divisors. Two divisors are said to be linearly equivalent if their difference is principal, so the divisor class group is the group of divisors modulo linear equivalence. For a variety X of dimension n over a field, the divisor class group is a Chow group; namely, Cl(X) is the Chow group CH_{n−1}(X) of (n−1)-dimensional cycles.

Let Z be a closed subset of X. If Z is irreducible of codimension one, then Cl(X − Z) is isomorphic to the quotient group of Cl(X) by the class of Z. If Z has codimension at least 2 in X, then the restriction Cl(X) → Cl(X − Z) is an isomorphism. (These facts are special cases of the localization sequence for Chow groups.)

On a normal integral Noetherian scheme X, two Weil divisors D, E are linearly equivalent if and only if $\mathcal{O}(D)$ and $\mathcal{O}(E)$ are isomorphic as $\mathcal{O}_X$-modules. Isomorphism classes of reflexive sheaves on X form a monoid with product given as the reflexive hull of a tensor product. Then $D \mapsto \mathcal{O}_X(D)$ defines a monoid isomorphism from the Weil divisor class group of X to the monoid of isomorphism classes of rank-one reflexive sheaves on X.

=== Examples ===
- Let k be a field, and let n be a positive integer. Since the polynomial ring k[x_{1}, ..., x_{n}] is a unique factorization domain, the divisor class group of affine space A^{n} over k is equal to zero. Since projective space P^{n} over k minus a hyperplane H is isomorphic to A^{n}, it follows that the divisor class group of P^{n} is generated by the class of H. From there, it is straightforward to check that Cl(P^{n}) is in fact isomorphic to the integers Z, generated by H. Concretely, this means that every codimension-1 subvariety of P^{n} is defined by the vanishing of a single homogeneous polynomial.
- Let X be an algebraic curve over a field k. Every closed point p in X has the form Spec E for some finite extension field E of k, and the degree of p is defined to be the degree of E over k. Extending this by linearity gives the notion of degree for a divisor on X. If X is a projective curve over k, then the divisor of a nonzero rational function f on X has degree zero. As a result, for a projective curve X, the degree gives a homomorphism deg: Cl(X) → Z.
- For the projective line P^{1} over a field k, the degree gives an isomorphism Cl(P^{1}) ≅ Z. For any smooth projective curve X with a k-rational point, the degree homomorphism is surjective, and the kernel is isomorphic to the group of k-points on the Jacobian variety of X, which is an abelian variety of dimension equal to the genus of X. It follows, for example, that the divisor class group of a complex elliptic curve is an uncountable abelian group.
- Generalizing the previous example: for any smooth projective variety X over a field k such that X has a k-rational point, the divisor class group Cl(X) is an extension of a finitely generated abelian group, the Néron–Severi group, by the group of k-points of a connected group scheme $\operatorname{Pic}^0_{X/k}.$ For k of characteristic zero, $\operatorname{Pic}^0_{X/k}$ is an abelian variety, the Picard variety of X.
- For R the ring of integers of a number field, the divisor class group Cl(R) := Cl(Spec R) is also called the ideal class group of R. It is a finite abelian group. Understanding ideal class groups is a central goal of algebraic number theory.
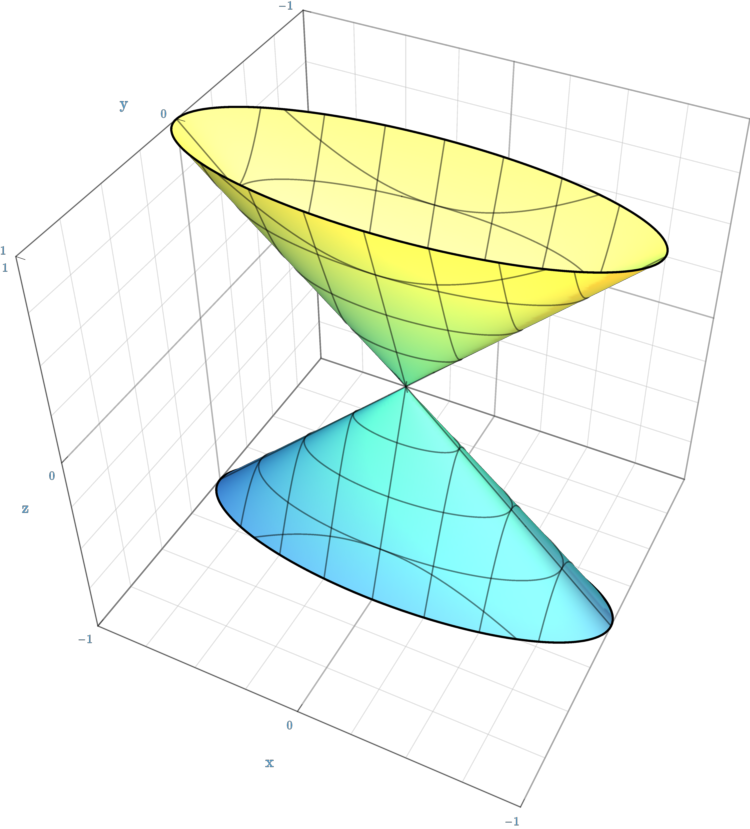
- The affine quadric cone xy = z^{2}.
  Let X be the quadric cone of dimension 2, defined by the equation xy = z^{2} in affine 3-space over a field. Then the line D in X defined by x = z = 0 is not principal on X near the origin. Note that D can be defined as a set by one equation on X, namely x = 0; but the function x on X vanishes to order 2 along D, and so we only find that 2D is Cartier (as defined below) on X. In fact, the divisor class group Cl(X) is isomorphic to the cyclic group Z/2, generated by the class of D.
- Let X be the quadric cone of dimension 3, defined by the equation xy = zw in affine 4-space over a field. Then the plane D in X defined by x = z = 0 cannot be defined in X by one equation near the origin, even as a set. It follows that D is not Q-Cartier on X; that is, no positive multiple of D is Cartier. In fact, the divisor class group Cl(X) is isomorphic to the integers Z, generated by the class of D.

=== The canonical divisor ===
Let X be a normal variety over a perfect field. The smooth locus U of X is an open subset whose complement has codimension at least 2. Let j: U → X be the inclusion map, then the restriction homomorphism:

$$j^*: \operatorname{Cl}(X) \to \operatorname{Cl}(U) = \operatorname{Pic}(U)$$

is an isomorphism, since X − U has codimension at least 2 in X. For example, one can use this isomorphism to define the canonical divisor K_{X} of X: it is the Weil divisor (up to linear equivalence) corresponding to the line bundle of differential forms of top degree on U. Equivalently, the sheaf $\mathcal{O}(K_X)$ on X is the direct image sheaf $j_*\Omega^n_U,$ where n is the dimension of X.

Example: Let X = P^{n} be the projective n-space with the homogeneous coordinates x_{0}, ..., x_{n}. Let U = {x_{0} ≠ 0}. Then U is isomorphic to the affine n-space with the coordinates y_{i} = x_{i}/x_{0}. Let

$$\omega = { dy_1 \over y_1 } \wedge \dots \wedge {dy_n \over y_n}.$$

Then ω is a rational differential form on U; thus, it is a rational section of $\Omega^n_{\mathbf{P}^n}$ which has simple poles along Z_{i} = {x_{i} = 0}, i = 1, ..., n. Switching to a different affine chart changes only the sign of ω and so we see ω has a simple pole along Z_{0} as well. Thus, the divisor of ω is

$$\operatorname{div}(\omega) = -Z_0 - \dots - Z_n$$

and its divisor class is

$$K_{\mathbf{P}^n} = [\operatorname{div}(\omega)] = -(n+1) [H]$$

where [H] = [Z_{i}], i = 0, ..., n. (See also the Euler sequence.)

== Cartier divisors ==
Let X be an integral Noetherian scheme. Then X has a sheaf of rational functions $\mathcal{M}_X.$ All regular functions are rational functions, which leads to a short exact sequence

$$0 \to \mathcal{O}_X^\times \to \mathcal{M}_X^\times \to \mathcal{M}_X^\times / \mathcal{O}_X^\times \to 0.$$

A Cartier divisor on X is a global section of $\mathcal{M}_X^\times / \mathcal{O}_X^\times.$ An equivalent description is that a Cartier divisor is a collection $\{(U_i, f_i)\},$ where $\{U_i\}$ is an open cover of $X, f_i$ is a section of $\mathcal M_X^\times$ on $U_i,$ and $f_i=f_j$ on $U_i \cap U_j$ up to multiplication by a section of $\mathcal O_X^\times.$

Cartier divisors also have a sheaf-theoretic description. A fractional ideal sheaf is a sub-$\mathcal O_X$-module of $\mathcal{M}_X.$ A fractional ideal sheaf J is invertible if, for each x in X, there exists an open neighborhood U of x on which the restriction of J to U is equal to $\mathcal{O}_U \cdot f,$ where $f \in \mathcal{M}_X^{\times}(U)$ and the product is taken in $\mathcal{M}_X.$ Each Cartier divisor defines an invertible fractional ideal sheaf using the description of the Cartier divisor as a collection $\{(U_i, f_i)\},$ and conversely, invertible fractional ideal sheaves define Cartier divisors. If the Cartier divisor is denoted D, then the corresponding fractional ideal sheaf is denoted $\mathcal{O}(D)$ or L(D).

By the exact sequence above, there is an exact sequence of sheaf cohomology groups:

$$H^0(X, \mathcal{M}^\times_X) \to H^0(X, \mathcal{M}^\times_X / \mathcal{O}^\times_X) \to H^1(X, \mathcal O^\times_X) = \operatorname{Pic}(X).$$

A Cartier divisor is said to be principal if it is in the image of the homomorphism $H^0(X,\mathcal{M}_X^{\times}) \to H^0(X, \mathcal{M}_X^{\times}/\mathcal{O}_X^{\times}),$ that is, if it is the divisor of a rational function on X. Two Cartier divisors are linearly equivalent if their difference is principal. Every line bundle L on an integral Noetherian scheme X is the class of some Cartier divisor. As a result, the exact sequence above identifies the Picard group of line bundles on an integral Noetherian scheme X with the group of Cartier divisors modulo linear equivalence. This holds more generally for reduced Noetherian schemes, or for quasi-projective schemes over a Noetherian ring, but it can fail in general (even for proper schemes over C), which lessens the interest of Cartier divisors in full generality.

Assume D is an effective Cartier divisor. Then there is a short exact sequence

$$0 \to \mathcal{O}_X \to \mathcal{O}_X(D) \to \mathcal{O}_D(D) \to 0.$$

This sequence is derived from the short exact sequence relating the structure sheaves of X and D and the ideal sheaf of D. Because D is a Cartier divisor, $\mathcal{O}(D)$ is locally free, and hence tensoring that sequence by $\mathcal{O}(D)$ yields another short exact sequence, the one above. When D is smooth, $\mathcal{O}_D(D)$ is the normal bundle of D in X.

=== Comparison of Weil divisors and Cartier divisors ===
A Weil divisor D is said to be Cartier if and only if the sheaf $\mathcal{O}(D)$ is invertible. When this happens, $\mathcal{O}(D)$ (with its embedding in M_{X}) is the line bundle associated to a Cartier divisor. More precisely, if $\mathcal{O}(D)$ is invertible, then there exists an open cover {U_{i}} such that $\mathcal{O}(D)$ restricts to a trivial bundle on each open set. For each U_{i}, choose an isomorphism $\mathcal{O}_{U_i} \to \mathcal{O}(D)|_{U_i}.$ The image of $1 \in \Gamma(U_i, \mathcal{O}_{U_i}) = \Gamma(U_i, \mathcal{O}_X)$ under this map is a section of $\mathcal{O}(D)$ on U_{i}. Because $\mathcal{O}(D)$ is defined to be a subsheaf of the sheaf of rational functions, the image of 1 may be identified with some rational function f_{i}. The collection $\{(U_i, f_i)\}$ is then a Cartier divisor. This is well-defined because the only choices involved were of the covering and of the isomorphism, neither of which change the Cartier divisor. This Cartier divisor may be used to produce a sheaf, which for distinction we will notate L(D). There is an isomorphism of $\mathcal{O}(D)$ with L(D) defined by working on the open cover {U_{i}}. The key fact to check here is that the transition functions of $\mathcal{O}(D)$ and L(D) are compatible, and this amounts to the fact that these functions all have the form $f_i/f_j.$

In the opposite direction, a Cartier divisor $\{(U_i, f_i)\}$ on an integral Noetherian scheme X determines a Weil divisor on X in a natural way, by applying $\operatorname{div}$ to the functions f_{i} on the open sets U_{i}.

If X is normal, a Cartier divisor is determined by the associated Weil divisor, and a Weil divisor is Cartier if and only if it is locally principal.

A Noetherian scheme X is called factorial if all local rings of X are unique factorization domains. (Some authors say "locally factorial".) In particular, every regular scheme is factorial. On a factorial scheme X, every Weil divisor D is locally principal, and so $\mathcal{O}(D)$ is always a line bundle. In general, however, a Weil divisor on a normal scheme need not be locally principal; see the examples of quadric cones above.

=== Effective Cartier divisors ===
Effective Cartier divisors are those which correspond to ideal sheaves. In fact, the theory of effective Cartier divisors can be developed without any reference to sheaves of rational functions or fractional ideal sheaves.

Let X be a scheme. An effective Cartier divisor on X is an ideal sheaf I which is invertible and such that for every point x in X, the stalk I_{x} is principal. It is equivalent to require that around each x, there exists an open affine subset U = Spec A such that U ∩ D = Spec A / (f), where f is a non-zero divisor in A. The sum of two effective Cartier divisors corresponds to multiplication of ideal sheaves.

There is a good theory of families of effective Cartier divisors. Let φ : X → S be a morphism. A relative effective Cartier divisor for X over S is an effective Cartier divisor D on X which is flat over S. Because of the flatness assumption, for every $S'\to S,$ there is a pullback of D to $X \times_S S',$ and this pullback is an effective Cartier divisor. In particular, this is true for the fibers of φ.

== Kodaira's lemma ==
As a basic result of the (big) Cartier divisor, there is a result called Kodaira's lemma:

Let X be a irreducible projective variety and let D be a big Cartier divisor on X and let H be an arbitrary effective Cartier divisor on X. Then

$$H^{0} (X, \mathcal{O}_{X} (mD - H)) \neq 0$$.

for all sufficiently large $m \in N (X,D)$.

Kodaira's lemma gives some results about the big divisor.

== Functoriality ==
Let φ : X → Y be a morphism of integral locally Noetherian schemes. It is often—but not always—possible to use φ to transfer a divisor D from one scheme to the other. Whether this is possible depends on whether the divisor is a Weil or Cartier divisor, whether the divisor is to be moved from X to Y or vice versa, and what additional properties φ might have.

If Z is a prime Weil divisor on X, then $\overline{\varphi(Z)}$ is a closed irreducible subscheme of Y. Depending on φ, it may or may not be a prime Weil divisor. For example, if φ is the blow up of a point in the plane and Z is the exceptional divisor, then its image is not a Weil divisor. Therefore, φ_{*}Z is defined to be $\overline{\varphi(Z)}$ if that subscheme is a prime divisor and is defined to be the zero divisor otherwise. Extending this by linearity will, assuming X is quasi-compact, define a homomorphism Div(X) → Div(Y) called the pushforward. (If X is not quasi-compact, then the pushforward may fail to be a locally finite sum.) This is a special case of the pushforward on Chow groups.

If Z is a Cartier divisor, then under mild hypotheses on φ, there is a pullback $\varphi^*Z$. Sheaf-theoretically, when there is a pullback map $\varphi^{-1}\mathcal{M}_Y \to \mathcal{M}_X$, then this pullback can be used to define pullback of Cartier divisors. In terms of local sections, the pullback of $\{(U_i, f_i)\}$ is defined to be $\{(\varphi ^{-1}(U_i), f_i \circ \varphi)\}$. Pullback is always defined if φ is dominant, but it cannot be defined in general. For example, if X = Z and φ is the inclusion of Z into Y, then φ^{*}Z is undefined because the corresponding local sections would be everywhere zero. (The pullback of the corresponding line bundle, however, is defined.)

If φ is flat, then pullback of Weil divisors is defined. In this case, the pullback of Z is φ^{*}Z = φ^{−1}(Z). The flatness of φ ensures that the inverse image of Z continues to have codimension one. This can fail for morphisms which are not flat, for example, for a small contraction.

== The first Chern class ==
For an integral Noetherian scheme X, the natural homomorphism from the group of Cartier divisors to that of Weil divisors gives a homomorphism

$$c_1 : \operatorname{Pic}(X) \to \operatorname{Cl}(X),$$

known as the first Chern class. The first Chern class is injective if X is normal, and it is an isomorphism if X is factorial (as defined above). In particular, Cartier divisors can be identified with Weil divisors on any regular scheme, and so the first Chern class is an isomorphism for X regular.

Explicitly, the first Chern class can be defined as follows. For a line bundle L on an integral Noetherian scheme X, let s be a nonzero rational section of L (that is, a section on some nonempty open subset of L), which exists by local triviality of L. Define the Weil divisor (s) on X by analogy with the divisor of a rational function. Then the first Chern class of L can be defined to be the divisor (s). Changing the rational section s changes this divisor by linear equivalence, since (fs) = (f) + (s) for a nonzero rational function f and a nonzero rational section s of L. So the element c_{1}(L) in Cl(X) is well-defined.

For a complex variety X of dimension n, not necessarily smooth or proper over C, there is a natural homomorphism, the cycle map, from the divisor class group to Borel–Moore homology:

$$\operatorname{Cl}(X) \to H_{2n-2}^{\operatorname{BM}}(X, \mathbf{Z}).$$

The latter group is defined using the space X(C) of complex points of X, with its classical (Euclidean) topology. Likewise, the Picard group maps to integral cohomology, by the first Chern class in the topological sense:

$$\operatorname{Pic}(X) \to H^2(X, \mathbf{Z}).$$

The two homomorphisms are related by a commutative diagram, where the right vertical map is cap product with the fundamental class of X in Borel–Moore homology:

$$\begin{array}{ccc}
\operatorname{Pic}(X) & \longrightarrow & H^2(X,\mathbf{Z})\\
\downarrow & & \downarrow \\
\operatorname{Cl}(X) &\longrightarrow & H_{2n-2}^{\operatorname{BM}}(X,\mathbf{Z})
\end{array}$$

For X smooth over C, both vertical maps are isomorphisms.

== Global sections of line bundles and linear systems ==
A Cartier divisor is effective if its local defining functions f_{i} are regular (not just rational functions). In that case, the Cartier divisor can be identified with a closed subscheme of codimension 1 in X, the subscheme defined locally by f_{i} = 0. A Cartier divisor D is linearly equivalent to an effective divisor if and only if its associated line bundle $\mathcal{O}(D)$ has a nonzero global section s; then D is linearly equivalent to the zero locus of s.

Let X be a projective variety over a field k. Then multiplying a global section of $\mathcal{O}(D)$ by a nonzero scalar in k does not change its zero locus. As a result, the projective space of lines in the k-vector space of global sections H^{0}(X, O(D)) can be identified with the set of effective divisors linearly equivalent to D, called the complete linear system of D. A projective linear subspace of this projective space is called a linear system of divisors.

One reason to study the space of global sections of a line bundle is to understand the possible maps from a given variety to projective space. This is essential for the classification of algebraic varieties. Explicitly, a morphism from a variety X to projective space P^{n} over a field k determines a line bundle L on X, the pullback of the standard line bundle $\mathcal{O}(1)$ on P^{n}. Moreover, L comes with n+1 sections whose base locus (the intersection of their zero sets) is empty. Conversely, any line bundle L with n+1 global sections whose common base locus is empty determines a morphism X → P^{n}. These observations lead to several notions of positivity for Cartier divisors (or line bundles), such as ample divisors and nef divisors.

For a divisor D on a projective variety X over a field k, the k-vector space H^{0}(X, O(D)) has finite dimension. The Riemann–Roch theorem is a fundamental tool for computing the dimension of this vector space when X is a projective curve. Successive generalizations, the Hirzebruch–Riemann–Roch theorem and the Grothendieck–Riemann–Roch theorem, give some information about the dimension of H^{0}(X, O(D)) for a projective variety X of any dimension over a field.

Because the canonical divisor is intrinsically associated to a variety, a key role in the classification of varieties is played by the maps to projective space given by K_{X} and its positive multiples. The Kodaira dimension of X is a key birational invariant, measuring the growth of the vector spaces H^{0}(X, mK_{X}) (meaning H^{0}(X, O(mK_{X}))) as m increases. The Kodaira dimension divides all n-dimensional varieties into n+2 classes, which (very roughly) go from positive curvature to negative curvature.

== Q-divisors ==
Let X be a normal variety. A (Weil) Q-divisor is a finite formal linear combination of irreducible codimension-1 subvarieties of X with rational coefficients. (An R-divisor is defined similarly.) A Q-divisor is effective if the coefficients are nonnegative. A Q-divisor D is Q-Cartier if mD is a Cartier divisor for some positive integer m. If X is smooth, then every Q-divisor is Q-Cartier.

If

$$D= \sum_j a_j Z_j$$

is a Q-divisor, then its round-down is the divisor

$$\lfloor D\rfloor = \sum \lfloor a_j \rfloor Z_j,$$

where $\lfloor a \rfloor$ is the greatest integer less than or equal to a. The sheaf $\mathcal{O}(D)$ is then defined to be $\mathcal{O}(\lfloor D\rfloor).$

== The Grothendieck–Lefschetz hyperplane theorem ==
The Lefschetz hyperplane theorem implies that for a smooth complex projective variety X of dimension at least 4 and a smooth ample divisor Y in X, the restriction Pic(X) → Pic(Y) is an isomorphism. For example, if Y is a smooth complete intersection variety of dimension at least 3 in complex projective space, then the Picard group of Y is isomorphic to Z, generated by the restriction of the line bundle O(1) on projective space.

Grothendieck generalized Lefschetz's theorem in several directions, involving arbitrary base fields, singular varieties, and results on local rings rather than projective varieties. In particular, if R is a complete intersection local ring which is factorial in codimension at most 3 (for example, if the non-regular locus of R has codimension at least 4), then R is a unique factorization domain (and hence every Weil divisor on Spec(R) is Cartier). The dimension bound here is optimal, as shown by the example of the 3-dimensional quadric cone, above.
