= Max Noether =

German mathematician (1844–1921)

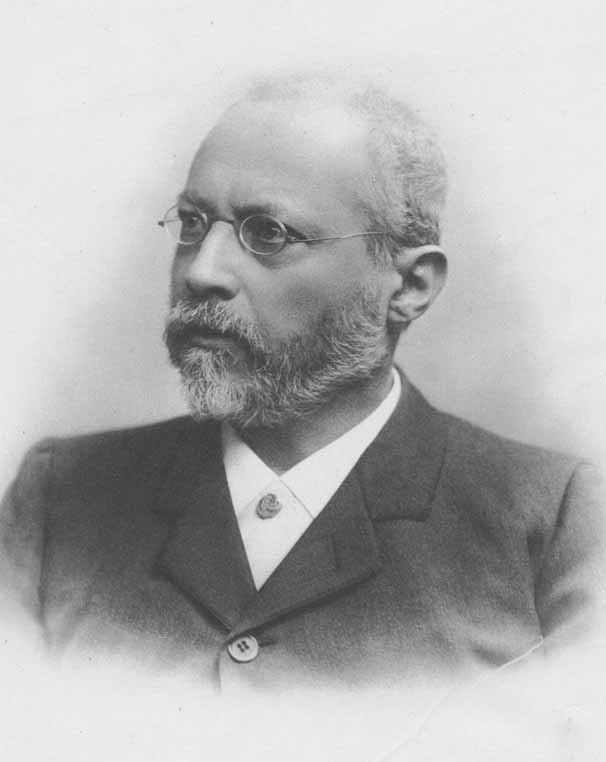
- Noether, c. 1870s
- Born: 24 September 1844; Mannheim, Grand Duchy of Baden, German Confederation
- Died: 13 December 1921 (aged 77); Erlangen, Bavaria, Germany
- Education: University of Heidelberg
- Known for: Algebraic geometry; Algebraic functions
- Children: 4, including Emmy and Fritz
- Scientific career
- Fields: Mathematics
- Workplaces: University of Heidelberg; University of Erlangen
- Doctoral advisors: Otto Hesse; Gustav Kirchhoff; Leo Königsberger (Dr. phil. hab. advisor)
- Other academic advisors: Alfred Clebsch
- Doctoral students: Richard Baldus; Emanuel Lasker; William Osgood; Hans Reichenbach

Max Noether (German: [ˈnøːtɐ]; 24 September 1844 – 13 December 1921) was a German mathematician who worked on algebraic geometry and the theory of algebraic functions. He has been called "one of the finest mathematicians of the nineteenth century". He was the father of Emmy Noether.

== Biography ==
Max Noether was born in Mannheim in 1844, to a Jewish family of wealthy wholesale hardware dealers. His grandfather, Elias Samuel, had started the business in Bruchsal in 1797. In 1809, the Grand Duchy of Baden established a "Tolerance Edict", which assigned a hereditary surname to the male head of every Jewish family which did not already possess one. Thus, the Samuels became the Noether family, and as part of this Christianization of names, their son Hertz (Max's father) became Hermann. Max was the third of five children Hermann had with his wife Amalia Würzburger.

At 14, Max contracted polio and was afflicted by its effects for the rest of his life. Through self-study, he learned advanced mathematics and entered the University of Heidelberg in 1865. He served on the faculty there for several years, then moved to the University of Erlangen in 1888. While there, he helped to found the field of algebraic geometry.

In 1880, he married Ida Amalia Kaufmann, the daughter of another wealthy Jewish merchant family. Two years later, they had their first child, named Amalia ("Emmy") after her mother. Emmy Noether went on to become a central figure in abstract algebra. In 1883, they had a son named Alfred, who later studied chemistry before dying in 1918. Their third child, Fritz Noether, was born in 1884, and like Emmy, found prominence as a mathematician; he was executed in the Soviet Union in 1941. Little is known about their fourth child, Gustav Robert, born in 1889; he suffered from continual illness and died in 1928.

Noether served as an Ordinarius (full professor) at Erlangen for many years and died there on 13 December 1921.

== Work on algebraic geometry ==
Brill and Max Noether developed alternative proofs using algebraic methods for much of Riemann's work on Riemann surfaces. Brill–Noether theory went further by estimating the dimension of the space of maps of given degree d from an algebraic curve to projective space P^{n}. In birational geometry, Noether introduced the fundamental technique of blowing up in order to prove resolution of singularities for plane curves.

Noether made major contributions to the theory of algebraic surfaces. Noether's formula is the first case of the Riemann-Roch theorem for surfaces. The Noether inequality is one of the main restrictions on the possible discrete invariants of a surface. The Noether-Lefschetz theorem (proved by Lefschetz) says that the Picard group of a very general surface of degree at least 4 in P^{3} is generated by the restriction of the line bundle O(1).

Noether and Castelnuovo showed that the Cremona group of birational automorphisms of the complex projective plane is generated by the "quadratic transformation"

[x,y,z] ↦ [1/x, 1/y, 1/z]

together with the group PGL(3,C) of automorphisms of P^{2}. Even today, no explicit generators are known for the group of birational automorphisms of P^{3}.

== See also ==
- Infinitely near point
- Brill–Noether theory
- Noether–Enriques–Petri theorem
- Noether's formula
- Noether inequality
- Noether's theorem on rationality for surfaces
- Max Noether's fundamental theorem
- Max Noether's theorem on curves
- List of second-generation Mathematicians
