= Invertible sheaf =

Type of sheaf of modules

In mathematics, an invertible sheaf is a sheaf on a ringed space that has an inverse with respect to tensor product of sheaves of modules. It is the equivalent in algebraic geometry of the topological notion of a line bundle. Due to their interactions with Cartier divisors, they play a central role in the study of algebraic varieties.

== Definition ==
Let (X, O_{X}) be a ringed space. Isomorphism classes of sheaves of O_{X}-modules form a monoid under the operation of tensor product of O_{X}-modules. The identity element for this operation is O_{X} itself. Invertible sheaves are the invertible elements of this monoid. Specifically, if L is a sheaf of O_{X}-modules, then L is called invertible if it satisfies any of the following equivalent conditions:

- There exists a sheaf M such that $L \otimes_{\mathcal{O}_X} M \cong \mathcal{O}_X$.
- The natural homomorphism $L \otimes_{\mathcal{O}_X} L^\vee \to \mathcal{O}_X$ is an isomorphism, where $L^\vee$ denotes the dual sheaf $\underline{\operatorname{Hom}}(L, \mathcal{O}_X)$.
- The functor from O_{X}-modules to O_{X}-modules defined by $F \mapsto F \otimes_{\mathcal{O}_X} L$ is an equivalence of categories.

Every locally free sheaf of rank one is invertible. If X is a locally ringed space, then L is invertible if and only if it is locally free of rank one. Because of this fact, invertible sheaves are closely related to line bundles, to the point where the two are sometimes conflated.

== Examples ==
Let X be an affine scheme Spec R. Then an invertible sheaf on X is the sheaf associated to a rank one projective module over R. For example, this includes fractional ideals of algebraic number fields, since these are rank one projective modules over the rings of integers of the number field.

== The Picard group ==
Quite generally, the isomorphism classes of invertible sheaves on X themselves form an abelian group under tensor product. This group generalises the ideal class group. In general it is written

$$\mathrm{Pic}(X)\$$

with Pic the Picard functor. Since it also includes the theory of the Jacobian variety of an algebraic curve, the study of this functor is a major issue in algebraic geometry.

The direct construction of invertible sheaves by means of data on X leads to the concept of Cartier divisor.

== See also ==
- First Chern class
- Birkhoff–Grothendieck theorem
