= List of complex and algebraic surfaces =

This is a list of named algebraic surfaces, compact complex surfaces, and families thereof, sorted according to their Kodaira dimension following Enriques–Kodaira classification.

== Kodaira dimension −∞ ==
=== Rational surfaces ===
- Projective plane

==== Quadric surfaces ====
- Cone (geometry)
- Cylinder
- Ellipsoid
- Hyperboloid
- Paraboloid
- Sphere
- Spheroid

==== Rational cubic surfaces ====
- Cayley nodal cubic surface, a certain cubic surface with 4 nodes
- Cayley's ruled cubic surface
- Clebsch surface or Klein icosahedral surface
- Fermat cubic
- Monkey saddle
- Parabolic conoid
- Plücker's conoid
- Whitney umbrella

==== Rational quartic surfaces ====
- Châtelet surfaces
- Dupin cyclides, inversions of a cylinder, torus, or double cone in a sphere
- Gabriel's horn
- Right circular conoid
- Roman surface or Steiner surface, a realization of the real projective plane in real affine space
- Tori, surfaces of revolution generated by a circle about a coplanar axis

==== Other rational surfaces in space ====
- Boy's surface, a sextic realization of the real projective plane in real affine space
- Enneper surface, a nonic minimal surface
- Henneberg surface, a minimal surface of degree 15
- Bour's minimal surface, a surface of degree 16
- Richmond surfaces, a family of minimal surfaces of variable degree

==== Other families of rational surfaces ====
- Coble surfaces
- Del Pezzo surfaces, surfaces with an ample anticanonical divisor
- Hirzebruch surfaces, rational ruled surfaces
- Segre surfaces, intersections of two quadrics in projective 4-space
- Unirational surfaces of characteristic 0
- Veronese surface, the Veronese embedding of the projective plane into projective 5-space
- White surfaces, the blow-up of the projective plane at $_{n+1}C_2$ points by the linear system of degree-$n$ curves through those points
  - Bordiga surfaces, the White surfaces determined by families of quartic curves

=== Class VII surfaces ===
- Vanishing second Betti number:
  - Hopf surfaces
  - Inoue surfaces; several other families discovered by Inoue have also been called "Inoue surfaces"
- Positive second Betti number:
  - Enoki surfaces
  - Inoue–Hirzebruch surfaces
  - Kato surfaces

== Kodaira dimension 0 ==
=== K3 surfaces ===
- Kummer surfaces
  - Tetrahedroids, special Kummer surfaces
  - Wave surface, a special tetrahedroid
- Plücker surfaces, birational to Kummer surfaces
- Weddle surfaces, birational to Kummer surfaces
- Smooth quartic surfaces
- Supersingular K3 surfaces

=== Enriques surfaces ===
- Reye congruences, the locus of lines that lie on at least two quadrics in a general three dimensional linear system of quadric surfaces in projective 3-space $\mathbb{P}^3$.
- The quotient of a K3 surface under a fixpointfree involution.

=== Abelian surfaces ===
- Horrocks–Mumford surfaces, surfaces of degree 10 in projective 4-space that are the zero locus of sections of the rank-two Horrocks–Mumford bundle

=== Other classes of dimension-0 surfaces ===
- Non-classical Enriques surfaces, a variation on the notion of Enriques surfaces that only exist in characteristic two
- Hyperelliptic surfaces or bielliptic surfaces; quasi-hyperelliptic surfaces are a variation of this notion that exist only in characteristics two and three
- Kodaira surfaces

== Kodaira dimension 1 ==
- Dolgachev surfaces

== Kodaira dimension 2 (surfaces of general type) ==
- Barlow surfaces
- Beauville surfaces
- Burniat surfaces
- Campedelli surfaces; surfaces of general type with the same Hodge numbers as Campedelli surfaces are called numerical Campidelli surfaces
- Castelnuovo surfaces
- Catanese surfaces
- Fake projective planes or Mumford surfaces, surfaces with the same Betti numbers as projective plane but not isomorphic to it
- Fano surface of lines on a non-singular 3-fold; sometimes, this term is taken to mean del Pezzo surface
- Godeaux surfaces; surfaces of general type with the same Hodge numbers as Godeaux surfaces are called numerical Godeaux surfaces
- Horikawa surfaces
- Todorov surfaces

== Families of surfaces with members in multiple classes ==
- Surfaces that are also Shimura varieties:
  - Hilbert modular surfaces
  - Humbert surfaces
  - Picard modular surfaces
  - Shioda modular surfaces
- Elliptic surfaces, surfaces with an elliptic fibration; quasielliptic surfaces constitute a modification this idea that occurs in finite characteristic
  - Raynaud surfaces and generalized Raynaud surfaces, certain quasielliptic counterexamples to the conclusions of the Kodaira vanishing theorem
- Exceptional surfaces, surfaces whose Picard number achieve the bound set by the central Hodge number h^{1,1}
- Kähler surfaces, complex surfaces with a Kähler metric; equivalently, surfaces for which the first Betti number b_{1} is even
- Minimal surfaces, surfaces that can't be obtained from another by blowing up at a point; they have no connection with the minimal surfaces of differential geometry
- Nodal surfaces, surfaces whose only singularities are nodes
  - Cayley's nodal cubic, which has 4 nodes
  - Kummer surfaces, quartic surfaces with 16 nodes
  - Togliatti surface, a certain quintic with 31 nodes
  - Barth surfaces, referring to a certain sextic with 65 nodes and decic with 345 nodes
  - Labs surface, a certain septic with 99 nodes
  - Endrass surface, a certain surface of degree 8 with 168 nodes
  - Sarti surface, a certain surface of degree 12 with 600 nodes
- Quotient surfaces, surfaces that are constructed as the orbit space of some other surface by the action of a finite group; examples include Kummer, Godeaux, Hopf, and Inoue surfaces
- Zariski surfaces, surfaces in finite characteristic that admit a purely inseparable dominant rational map from the projective plane

== See also ==
- Enriques–Kodaira classification
- List of surfaces
