= Cubic form =

Homogeneous polynomial of degree 3

In mathematics, a cubic form is a homogeneous polynomial of degree 3, and a cubic hypersurface is the zero set of a cubic form. In the case of a cubic form in three variables, the zero set is a cubic plane curve.

In (Delone & Faddeev 1964), Boris Delone and Dmitry Faddeev showed that binary cubic forms with integer coefficients can be used to parametrize orders in cubic fields. Their work was generalized in (Gan, Gross & Savin 2002, §4) to include all cubic rings (a cubic ring is a ring that is isomorphic to Z^{3} as a Z-module), giving a discriminant-preserving bijection between orbits of a GL(2, Z)-action on the space of integral binary cubic forms and cubic rings up to isomorphism.

The classification of real cubic forms $a x^3 + 3 b x^2 y + 3 c x y^2 + d y^3$ is linked to the classification of umbilical points of surfaces. The equivalence classes of such cubics form a three-dimensional real projective space and the subset of parabolic forms define a surface – the umbilic torus.

== Examples ==
- Cubic 3-fold
- Cubic plane curve
- Elliptic curve
- Fermat cubic
- Klein cubic threefold
- Koras–Russell cubic threefold
- Segre cubic
