= Surface of general type =

In algebraic geometry, a surface of general type is an algebraic surface with Kodaira dimension 2. Because of Chow's theorem any compact complex manifold of dimension 2 and with Kodaira dimension 2 will actually be an algebraic surface, and in some sense most surfaces are in this class.

== Classification ==
Gieseker showed that there is a coarse moduli scheme for surfaces of general type; this means that for any fixed values of the Chern numbers $c_1^2, c_2,$ there is a quasi-projective scheme classifying the surfaces of general type with those Chern numbers. It remains a very difficult problem to describe these schemes explicitly, and there are few pairs of Chern numbers for which this has been done (except when the scheme is empty). There are some indications that these schemes are in general too complicated to write down explicitly: the known upper bounds for the number of components are very large, some components can be non-reduced everywhere, components may have many different dimensions, and the few pieces that have been studied explicitly tend to look rather complicated.

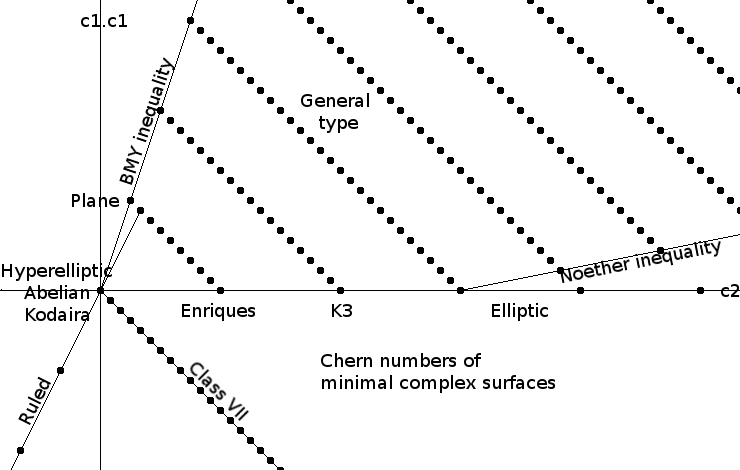
Chern numbers of minimal complex surfaces

The study of which pairs of Chern numbers can occur for a surface of general type is known as "geography of Chern numbers" and there is an almost complete answer to this question. There are several conditions that the Chern numbers of a minimal complex surface of general type must satisfy:

- $c_1^2 + c_2 \equiv 0 \pmod{12}$ (as it is equal to 12χ)
- $c_1^2, c_2 \geqslant 0$
- $c_1^2 \leqslant 3c_2$ (the Bogomolov-Miyaoka-Yau inequality)
- $5c_1^2 - c_2 + 36 \geqslant 12q \geqslant 0$ where q is the irregularity of a surface (the Noether inequality).

Many (and possibly all) pairs of integers satisfying these conditions are the Chern numbers for some complex surface of general type. By contrast, for almost complex surfaces, the only constraint is:

$$c_1^2+c_2 \equiv 0 \pmod{12},$$

and this can always be realized.

== Examples ==
This is only a small selection of the rather large number of examples of surfaces of general type that have been found. Many of the surfaces of general type that have been investigated lie on (or near) the edges of the region of possible Chern numbers. In particular Horikawa surfaces lie on or near the "Noether line", many of the surfaces listed below lie on the line $c_1^2 + c_2 = 12 \chi = 12,$ the minimum possible value for general type, and surfaces on the line are all quotients of the unit ball in C^{2} (and are particularly hard to find).

=== Surfaces with χ=1 ===
These surface which are located in the "lower left" boundary in the diagram have been studied in detail. For these surfaces with second Chern class can be any integer from 3 to 11. Surfaces with all these values are known; a few of the many examples that have been studied are:

- c_{2} = 3: Fake projective plane (Mumford surface). The first example was found by Mumford using p-adic geometry, and there are 50 examples altogether. They have the same Betti numbers as the projective plane, but are not homeomorphic to it as their fundamental groups are infinite.
- c_{2} = 4: Beauville surfaces are named for Arnaud Beauville and have infinite fundamental group.
- c_{2} ≥ 4: Burniat surfaces
- c_{2} = 10: Campedelli surfaces. Surfaces with the same Hodge numbers are called numerical Campedelli surfaces.
- c_{2} = 10: Catanese surfaces are simply connected.
- c_{2} = 11: Godeaux surfaces. The cyclic group of order 5 acts freely on the Fermat surface of points $(w:x:y:z)$ in P^{3} satisfying $w^5+x^5+y^5+z^5=0$ by mapping $(w:x:y:z)$ to $(w:\rho x:\rho^2 y: \rho^3 z)$ where ρ is a fifth root of 1. The quotient by this action is the original Godeaux surface. Other surfaces constructed in a similar way with the same Hodge numbers are also sometimes called Godeaux surfaces. Surfaces with the same Hodge numbers (such as Barlow surfaces) are called numerical Godeaux surfaces. The fundamental group (of the original Godeaux surface) is cyclic of order 5.
- c_{2} = 11: Barlow surfaces are simply connected. Together with the Craighero-Gattazzo surface, these are the only known examples of simply connected surfaces of general type with p_{g} = 0.
- Todorov surfaces give counterexamples to the conclusion of the Torelli theorem.

=== Other examples ===
- Castelnuovo surfaces: Another extremal case, Castelnuovo proved that if the canonical bundle is very ample for a surface of general type then $c_1^2 \geqslant 3p_g -7.$ Castelnuovo surface are surfaces of general type such that the canonical bundle is very ample and that $c_1^2 = 3p_g -7.$
- Complete intersections: A smooth complete intersection of hypersurfaces of degrees $d_1 \geqslant d_2 \geqslant \cdots \geqslant d_{n-2} \geqslant 2$ in P^{n} is a surface of general type unless the degrees are (2), (3), (2, 2) (rational), (4), (3, 2), (2, 2, 2) (Kodaira dimension 0). Complete intersections are all simply connected. A special case are hypersurfaces: for example, in P^{3}, non-singular surfaces of degree at least 5 are of general type (Non-singular hypersurfaces of degree 4 are K3 surfaces, and those of degree less than 4 are rational).
- Fano surfaces of lines on a cubic 3-fold.
- Hilbert modular surfaces are mostly of general type.
- Horikawa surfaces are surfaces with q = 0 and $p_g=\tfrac{1}{2} c_1^2 + 2$ or $\tfrac{1}{2}c_1^2 + \tfrac{3}{2}$ (which implies that they are more or less on the "Noether line" edge of the region of possible values of the Chern numbers). They are all simply connected, and Horikawa gave a detailed description of them.
- Products: the product of two curves both of genus at least 2 is a surface of general type.
- Double covers of non-singular degree 2m curves in P^{2} are of general type if $2m \geqslant 8.$ (For 2m=2 they are rational, for 2m=4 they are again rational and called del Pezzo double planes, and for 2m=6 they are K3 surfaces.) They are simply connected, and have Chern numbers $c_1^2 = 2(m-3)^2, c_2 = 4m^2 - 6m +6.$

== Canonical models ==
Bombieri (1973) proved that the multicanonical map φ_{nK} for a complex surface of general type is a birational isomorphism onto its image whenever n≥5, and Ekedahl (1988) showed that the same result still holds in positive characteristic. There are some surfaces for which it is not a birational isomorphism when n is 4. These results follow from Reider's theorem.

== See also ==
- Enriques–Kodaira classification
- List of algebraic surfaces
