= Labs septic =

Algebraic surface with 99 nodes

In mathematics, the Labs septic surface is a degree-7 (septic) nodal surface with 99 nodes found by Labs (2006). As of 2015, it has the largest known number of nodes of a degree-7 surface, though this number is still less than the best known upper bound of 104 nodes given by Varchenko (1983).

3D model of affine chart of the real Labs septic

== See also ==
- Barth surface
- Endrass surface
- Sarti surface
- Togliatti surface
