= Kato surface =

In mathematics, a Kato surface is a compact complex surface with positive first Betti number that has a global spherical shell. Kato (1978) showed that Kato surfaces have small analytic deformations that are the blowups of primary Hopf surfaces at a finite number of points. In particular they have an infinite cyclic fundamental group, and are never Kähler manifolds. Examples of Kato surfaces include Inoue-Hirzebruch surfaces and Enoki surfaces. The global spherical shell conjecture claims that all class VII surfaces with positive second Betti number are Kato surfaces.
