= Bordiga =

Bordiga may refer to:

- Amadeo Bordiga (1889–1970), Italian communist
- Giovanni Bordiga (1854–1933), Italian mathematician
  - Bordiga surface, a mathematical surface introduced by Giovanni Bordiga
