= Belgian Mathematical Society =

- Belgian Mathematical Society
- Abbreviation: BMS
- Type: Scientific society
- Location: Belgium
- Field: Mathematics
- President: Joost Vercruysse
- Website: https://bms.ulb.ac.be/

The Belgian Mathematical Society (abbreviated as BMS), founded in 1921 by Théophile de Donder at the Université libre de Bruxelles, is the national mathematical society of Belgium and a member society of the European Mathematical Society. Its mission is to assemble all Belgian mathematicians and defend their interests. Foreign members are also welcome.

The society publishes the journal Bulletin of the Belgian Mathematical Society - Simon Stevin and distributes a newsletter to members, both at a rate of five issues per year.

== Presidents ==
- 14/3/1921-14/01/1922 Théophile De Donder (1872–1957) ULBruxelles
- 1923–1925 Henri Bosmans (1852–1928) ULBruxelles
- 1925–1927 Alphonse Demoulin (1869–1947) U Gent
- 1927–1929 Charles Jean de La Vallée Poussin (1866–1962) C. U. of Leuven
- 1929–1931 Adolphe Mineur (1867–1950) ULBruxelles
- 1931–1933 Lucien Godeaux (1887–1975) ULBruxelles
- 1933–1935 Alfred Errera (1886–1960) ULBruxelles
- 1935–1937 Émile Merlin (1875–1930) U Gent
- 1937–1939 Fernand Simonart (1888–1966) C. U. of Leuven
- 1939–1945 Bony U. Mons-Hainaut
- 1945–1947 Henri Germay (1894–1954) U Liège
- 1947–1949 Georges Lemaître (1894–1966) C. U. of Leuven
- 1949–1951 Théophile Lepage (1901–1991) ULBruxelles
- 1951–1953 Fernand Backes (1897–1985) U Gent
- 1953–1955 Octave Rozet U Liège
- 1955–1957 Louis Bouckaert (1909–1988) C. U. of Leuven
- 1957–1959 Paul Libois (1901–1991) ULBruxelles
- 1959–1961 Julien Bilo (1914–2006) U Gent
- 1961–1963 Henri Garnir (1921–1985) U Liège
- 1964–1965 Robert Ballieu (1914–1980) UCLouvain
- 1966–1967 Eduard Franckx (1907– ) KMS – ERM
- 1968–1969 Pol Burniat (1902–1975) ULBruxelles
- 1970–1971 Carl Clement Grosjean (1926–2006) U Gent
- 1972–1973 René Lavendhomme (1928–2002) UCLouvain
- 1974–1975 Henri Breny (1923–1991) U Liège
- 1976–1977 Alfred Warrinier (1938) K.U.Leuven
- 1978–1979 Robert Debever (1915–1998) ULBruxelles
- 1980–1981 Franz Bingen (1932) VUBrussel
- 1982–1983 José Paris UCLouvain
- 10/1983-10/1986 Richard Delanghe (1940) U Gent
- 10/1986-10/1988 Paul van Praag (1938-2019) U Mons-Hainaut
- 10/1988-1992 Alain Verschoren (1954-2020) U Antwerpen
- 1993-10/1996 Luc Lemaire (1950) ULBruxelles
- 10/1996-10/1999 Freddy Dumortier (1947) U Hasselt
- 10/1999-10/2002 Jean Schmets (1940) U Liège
- 10/2002-10/2005 Adhemar Bultheel (1948) K.U.Leuven
- 10/2005-10/2008 Cathérine Finet U Mons-Hainaut
- 10/2008-10/2011 Stefaan Caenepeel (1956) VUBrussel
- 10/2011-9/2015 Françoise Bastin U. Liège
- 10/2015-9/2018 Philippe Cara VU Brussel
- 10/2018-9/2023 Yves-Caoimhin (Yvik) Swan Uni. of Liège
- 10/2023- Joost Vercruysse ULBruxelles
