= Alessandra Sarti =

Italian mathematician

Alessandra Sarti (born 1974) is an Italian mathematician specializing in algebraic geometry. She is the namesake of the Sarti surface, and has also published research on K3 surfaces. She works in France as a professor at the University of Poitiers and deputy director of the Institut national des sciences mathématiques et de leurs interactions (Insmi) of the French National Centre for Scientific Research in Paris.

== Education and career ==
Sarti was born in 1974, in Ferrara, Italy. After studying for a laurea at the University of Ferrara from 1993 to 1997, she moved to Germany for graduate study in mathematics. After a year at the University of Göttingen, supported by an Italian research grant, she became a research assistant at the University of Erlangen–Nuremberg. She completed her Ph.D. there in 2001, with the dissertation Pencils of symmetric surfaces in $\mathbb{P}_3$, supervised by Wolf Barth.

She took an assistant professor position at the University of Mainz in Germany, from 2003 to 2008, earning a habilitation there in 2007. After a temporary faculty position at the University of Erlangen–Nuremberg, she became a full professor at the University of Poitiers in France in 2008. At the University of Poitiers, she directed the Laboratoire de Mathématiques et Applications from 2016 to 2021. Since 2022, she has held a second affiliation as deputy director of the Institut national des sciences mathématiques et de leurs interactions of the French National Centre for Scientific Research (CNRS), in Paris.

== Research ==
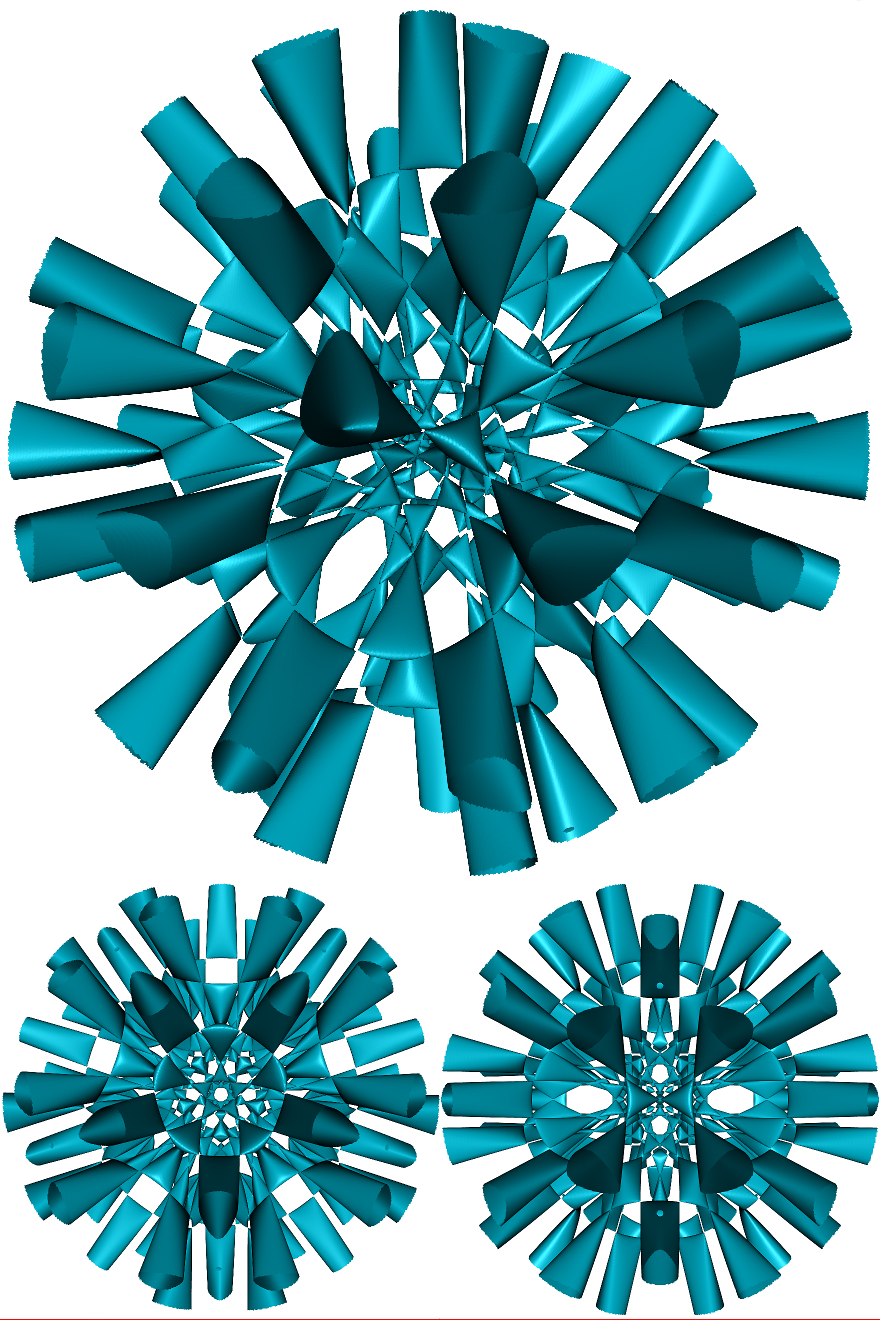
Three views of the Sarti surface

Sarti is the namesake of the Sarti surfaces (also called Sarti dodecics) a family of degree-12 nodal surfaces with 600 nodes that she discovered in 1999 and published in 2001.^{[SS]} One member of the family can be chosen so that 560 of the nodes have real rather than complex coordinates.

The Sarti surface has a K3 surface as one of its quotients, and some of Sarti's other publications include research on the symmetries of K3 surfaces.^{[K3a]}^{[K3b]}

=== Selected publications ===
SS.	Sarti, A. (2001), "Pencils of symmetric surfaces in $\mathbb{P}_3$", Journal of Algebra, 246 (1): 429–452, arXiv:math/0106080, doi:10.1006/jabr.2001.8953, MR 1872630

K3a.	van Geemen, Bert; Sarti, Alessandra (2007), "Nikulin involutions on $K3$ surfaces", Mathematische Zeitschrift, 255 (4): 731–753, arXiv:math/0602015, doi:10.1007/s00209-006-0047-6, MR 2274533

K3b.	Artebani, Michela; Sarti, Alessandra; Taki, Shingo (2011), "$K3$ surfaces with non-symplectic automorphisms of prime order", Mathematische Zeitschrift, 268 (1–2): 507–533, arXiv:0903.3481, doi:10.1007/s00209-010-0681-x, MR 2805445

== Personal life ==
Sarti has a twin sister, Cristina Sarti, who also did a Ph.D. in mathematics in Germany.
