= Shioda =

Shioda (written: 塩田) is a Japanese surname. Notable people with the surname include:

- Gozo Shioda (塩田 剛三, 1915 – 1994), Japanese martial artist
- Tetsuji Shioda (塩田 徹治), Japanese mathematician
  - Shioda modular surface
- Yasuhisa Shioda (塩田 泰久, born 1952), Japanese martial artist
