= Campedelli =

Campedelli is an Italian surname. Notable people with the surname include:

- Dominic Campedelli (born 1964), American ice hockey player
- Nicola Campedelli (born 1979), Italian footballer and manager

== See also ==
- Campedelli surface
