= Godeaux surface =

One of the surfaces of general type introduced by Lucien Godeaux in 1931

In mathematics, a Godeaux surface is one of the surfaces of general type introduced by Lucien Godeaux in 1931. Other surfaces constructed in a similar way with the same Hodge numbers are also sometimes called Godeaux surfaces. Surfaces with the same Hodge numbers (such as Barlow surfaces) are called numerical Godeaux surfaces.

== Construction ==
The cyclic group of order 5 acts freely on the Fermat surface of points (w : x : y : z) in P^{3} satisfying w^{5} + x^{5} + y^{5} + z^{5} = 0 by mapping (w : x : y : z) to (w:ρx:ρ^{2}y:ρ^{3}z) where ρ is a fifth root of 1. The quotient by this action is the original Godeaux surface.

== Invariants ==
The fundamental group (of the original Godeaux surface) is cyclic of order 5. It has invariants $q = 0, p_g = 0$ like rational surfaces do, though it is not rational. The square of the first Chern class $c_1^2 = 1$ (and moreover the canonical class is ample).

Hodge diamond
		1
	0		0
0		9		0
	0		0
		1

== See also ==
- Hodge theory
