= Rational surface =

Surface in algebraic geometry

In algebraic geometry, a branch of mathematics, a rational surface is a surface birationally equivalent to the projective plane, or in other words a rational variety of dimension two. Rational surfaces are the simplest of the 10 or so classes of surface in the Enriques–Kodaira classification of complex surfaces, and were the first surfaces to be investigated.

== Structure ==
Every non-singular rational surface can be obtained by repeatedly blowing up a minimal rational surface. The minimal rational surfaces are the projective plane and the Hirzebruch surfaces Σ_{r} for r = 0 or r ≥ 2.

Invariants: The plurigenera are all 0 and the fundamental group is trivial.

Hodge diamond:

		1
	0		0
0		1+n		0
	0		0
		1

where n is 0 for the projective plane, and 1 for Hirzebruch surfaces and greater than 1 for other rational surfaces.

The Picard group is the odd unimodular lattice I_{1,n}, except for the Hirzebruch surfaces Σ_{2m} when it is the even unimodular lattice II_{1,1}.

== Castelnuovo's theorem ==
Guido Castelnuovo proved that any complex surface such that q and P_{2} (the irregularity and second plurigenus) both vanish is rational. This is used in the Enriques–Kodaira classification to identify the rational surfaces. Zariski (1958) proved that Castelnuovo's theorem also holds over fields of positive characteristic.

Castelnuovo's theorem also implies that any unirational complex surface is rational, because if a complex surface is unirational then its irregularity and plurigenera are bounded by those of a rational surface and are therefore all 0, so the surface is rational. Most unirational complex varieties of dimension 3 or larger are not rational. In characteristic p > 0 Zariski (1958) found examples of unirational surfaces (Zariski surfaces) that are not rational.

At one time it was unclear whether a complex surface such that q and P_{1} both vanish is rational, but a counterexample (an Enriques surface) was found by Federigo Enriques.

== Examples of rational surfaces ==
- Bordiga surfaces: A degree 6 embedding of the projective plane into P^{4} defined by the quartics through 10 points in general position.
- Châtelet surfaces
- Coble surfaces
- Cubic surfaces Nonsingular cubic surfaces are isomorphic to the projective plane blown up in 6 points, and are Fano surfaces. Named examples include the Fermat cubic, the Cayley cubic surface, and the Clebsch diagonal surface.
- del Pezzo surfaces (Fano surfaces)
- Enneper surface
- Hirzebruch surfaces Σ_{n}
- P^{1}×P^{1} The product of two projective lines is the Hirzebruch surface Σ_{0}. It is the only surface with two different rulings.
- The projective plane
- Segre surface An intersection of two quadrics, isomorphic to the projective plane blown up in 5 points.
- Steiner surface A surface in P^{4} with singularities which is birational to the projective plane.
- White surfaces, a generalization of Bordiga surfaces.
- Veronese surface An embedding of the projective plane into P^{5}.

== See also ==
- List of algebraic surfaces
