= Inoue surface =

In complex geometry, an Inoue surface is any of several complex surfaces of Kodaira class VII. They are named after Masahisa Inoue, who gave the first non-trivial examples of Kodaira class VII surfaces in 1974.

The Inoue surfaces are not Kähler manifolds.

== Inoue surfaces with b_{2} = 0 ==
Inoue introduced three families of surfaces, S^{0}, S^{+} and S^{−}, which are compact quotients of $\Complex \times \mathbb{H}$ (a product of a complex plane by a half-plane). These Inoue surfaces are solvmanifolds. They are obtained as quotients of $\Complex \times \mathbb{H}$ by a solvable discrete group which acts holomorphically on $\Complex \times \mathbb{H}.$

The solvmanifold surfaces constructed by Inoue all have second Betti number $b_2=0$. These surfaces are of Kodaira class VII, which means that they have $b_1=1$ and Kodaira dimension $-\infty$. It was proven by Bogomolov, Li–Yau and Teleman that any surface of class VII with $b_2=0$ is a Hopf surface or an Inoue-type solvmanifold.

These surfaces have no meromorphic functions and no curves.

K. Hasegawa gives a list of all complex 2-dimensional solvmanifolds; these are complex torus, hyperelliptic surface, Kodaira surface and Inoue surfaces S^{0}, S^{+} and S^{−}.

The Inoue surfaces are constructed explicitly as follows.

=== Of type S^{0} ===
Let φ be an integer 3 × 3 matrix, with two complex eigenvalues $\alpha, \overline{\alpha}$ and a real eigenvalue c > 1, with $|\alpha|^2c=1$. Then φ is invertible over integers, and defines an action of the group of integers, $\Z,$ on $\Z^3$. Let $\Gamma:=\Z^3\rtimes\Z.$ This group is a lattice in solvable Lie group

$$\R^3\rtimes\R = (\C \times\R ) \rtimes\R,$$

acting on $\C \times \R,$ with the $(\C \times\R )$-part acting by translations and the $\rtimes\R$-part as $(z,r) \mapsto (\alpha^tz, c^tr).$

We extend this action to $\C \times \mathbb{H} = \C \times \R \times \R^{>0}$ by setting $v \mapsto e^{\log ct} v$, where t is the parameter of the $\rtimes\R$-part of $\R^3\rtimes\R,$ and acting trivially with the $\R^3$ factor on $\R^{>0}$. This action is clearly holomorphic, and the quotient $\C \times \mathbb{H}/\Gamma$ is called Inoue surface of type $S^0.$

The Inoue surface of type S^{0} is determined by the choice of an integer matrix φ, constrained as above. There is a countable number of such surfaces.

=== Of type S^{+} ===
Let n be a positive integer, and $\Lambda_n$ be the group of upper triangular matrices

$$\begin{bmatrix}
1 & x & z/n \\
0 & 1 & y \\
0 & 0 & 1 \end{bmatrix}, \qquad x,y,z \in \Z.$$

The quotient of $\Lambda_n$ by its center C is $\Z^2$. Let φ be an automorphism of $\Lambda_n$, we assume that φ acts on $\Lambda_n/C=\Z^2$ as a matrix with two positive real eigenvalues a, b, and ab = 1. Consider the solvable group $\Gamma_n := \Lambda_n\rtimes \Z,$ with $\Z$ acting on $\Lambda_n$ as φ. Identifying the group of upper triangular matrices with $\R^3,$ we obtain an action of $\Gamma_n$ on $\R^3= \C \times \R.$ Define an action of $\Gamma_n$ on $\C \times \mathbb{H}= \C \times \R \times \R^{>0}$ with $\Lambda_n$ acting trivially on the $\R^{>0}$-part and the $\Z$ acting as $v \mapsto e^{t \log b}v.$ The same argument as for Inoue surfaces of type $S^0$ shows that this action is holomorphic. The quotient $\C \times \mathbb{H}/\Gamma_n$ is called Inoue surface of type $S^+.$

=== Of type S^{−} ===
Inoue surfaces of type $S^-$ are defined in the same way as for S^{+}, but two eigenvalues a, b of φ acting on $\Z^2$ have opposite sign and satisfy ab = −1. Since a square of such an endomorphism defines an Inoue surface of type S^{+}, an Inoue surface of type S^{−} has an unramified double cover of type S^{+}.

== Parabolic and hyperbolic Inoue surfaces ==
Parabolic and hyperbolic Inoue surfaces are Kodaira class VII surfaces defined by Iku Nakamura in 1984. They are not solvmanifolds. These surfaces have positive second Betti number. They have spherical shells, and can be deformed into a blown-up Hopf surface.

Parabolic Inoue surfaces contain a cycle of rational curves with 0 self-intersection and an elliptic curve. They are a particular case of Enoki surfaces which have a cycle of rational curves with zero self-intersection but without elliptic curve. Half-Inoue surfaces contain a cycle C of rational curves and are a quotient of a hyperbolic Inoue surface with two cycles of rational curves.

Hyperbolic Inoue surfaces are class VII_{0} surfaces with two cycles of rational curves. Parabolic and hyperbolic surfaces are particular cases of minimal surfaces with global spherical shells (GSS) also called Kato surfaces. All these surfaces may be constructed by non invertible contractions.
