= Klein cubic =

Klein cubic can refer to:

- Klein cubic surface
- Klein cubic threefold
