= Bogomolov–Miyaoka–Yau inequality =

Mathematical inequality

In mathematics, the Bogomolov–Miyaoka–Yau inequality is the inequality

$$c_1^2 \le 3 c_2$$

between Chern numbers of compact complex surfaces of general type. Its major interest is the way it restricts the possible topological types of the underlying real 4-manifold. It was proved independently by Shing-Tung Yau (1977, 1978) and Yoichi Miyaoka (1977), after Antonius Van de Ven (1966) and Fedor Bogomolov (1978) proved weaker versions with the constant 3 replaced by 8 and 4.

Armand Borel and Friedrich Hirzebruch showed that the inequality is best possible by finding infinitely many cases where equality holds. The inequality is false in positive characteristic: William E. Lang (1983) and Robert W. Easton (2008) gave examples of surfaces in characteristic p, such as generalized Raynaud surfaces, for which it fails.

== Formulation of the inequality ==
The conventional formulation of the Bogomolov–Miyaoka–Yau inequality is as follows. Let X be a compact complex surface of general type, and let c_{1} = c_{1}(X) and c_{2} = c_{2}(X) be the first and second Chern class of the complex tangent bundle of the surface. Then

$$c_1^2 \le 3 c_2.$$

Moreover if equality holds then X is a quotient of a ball. The latter statement is a consequence of Yau's differential geometric approach which is based on his resolution of the Calabi conjecture.

Since $c_2(X) = e(X)$ is the topological Euler characteristic and by the Thom–Hirzebruch signature theorem $c_1^2(X) = 2 e(X) + 3\sigma(X)$ where $\sigma(X)$ is the signature of the intersection form on the second cohomology, the Bogomolov–Miyaoka–Yau inequality can also be written as a restriction on the topological type of the surface of general type:

$$\sigma(X) \le \frac{1}{3} e(X),$$

moreover if $\sigma(X) = (1/3)e(X)$ then the universal covering is a ball.

Together with the Noether inequality the Bogomolov–Miyaoka–Yau inequality sets boundaries in the search for complex surfaces. Mapping out the topological types that are realized as complex surfaces is called geography of surfaces. see surfaces of general type.

== Surfaces with c_{1}^{2} = 3c_{2} ==
If X is a surface of general type with $c_1^2 = 3 c_2$, so that equality holds in the Bogomolov–Miyaoka–Yau inequality, then Yau (1977) proved that X is isomorphic to a quotient of the unit ball in ${\mathbb C}^2$ by an infinite discrete group. Examples of surfaces satisfying this equality are hard to find. Borel (1963) showed that there are infinitely many values of c^{2}_{1} = 3c_{2} for which a surface exists. David Mumford (1979) found a fake projective plane with c^{2}_{1} = 3c_{2} = 9, which is the minimum possible value because c^{2}_{1} + c_{2} is always divisible by 12, and Prasad & Yeung (2007), Prasad & Yeung (2010), Donald I. Cartwright and Tim Steger (2010) showed that there are exactly 50 fake projective planes.

Barthel, Hirzebruch & Höfer (1987) gave a method for finding examples, which in particular produced a surface X with c^{2}_{1} = 3c_{2} = 3^{2}5^{4}. Ishida (1988) found a quotient of this surface with c^{2}_{1} = 3c_{2} = 45, and taking unbranched coverings of this quotient gives examples with c^{2}_{1} = 3c_{2} = 45k for any positive integer k. Donald I. Cartwright and Tim Steger (2010) found examples with c^{2}_{1} = 3c_{2} = 9n for every positive integer n.
