= Fake projective space =

Complex algebraic variety

In mathematics, a fake projective space is a complex algebraic variety that has the same Betti numbers as some projective space, but is not isomorphic to it.

There are exactly 50 fake projective planes. Prasad & Yeung (2006) found four examples of fake projective 4-folds, and showed that no arithmetic examples exist in dimensions other than 2 and 4.
