= Barth–Nieto quintic =

In algebraic geometry, the Barth–Nieto quintic is a quintic 3-fold in 4 (or sometimes 5) dimensional projective space studied by Wolf Barth and Isidro Nieto (1994) that is the Hessian of the Segre cubic.

== Definition ==
The Barth–Nieto quintic is the closure of the set of points (x_{0}:x_{1}:x_{2}:x_{3}:x_{4}:x_{5}) of P^{5} satisfying the equations

$$\displaystyle x_0+x_1+x_2+x_3+x_4+x_5= 0$$
$$\displaystyle x_0^{-1}+x_1^{-1}+x_2^{-1}+x_3^{-1}+x_4^{-1}+x_5^{-1} = 0.$$

== Properties ==
The Barth–Nieto quintic is not rational, but has a smooth model that is a modular Calabi–Yau manifold with Kodaira dimension zero. Furthermore, it is birationally equivalent to a compactification of the Siegel modular variety A_{1,3}(2).
