= Barth surface =

Algebraic surface with many double points

3D model of Barth-sextic

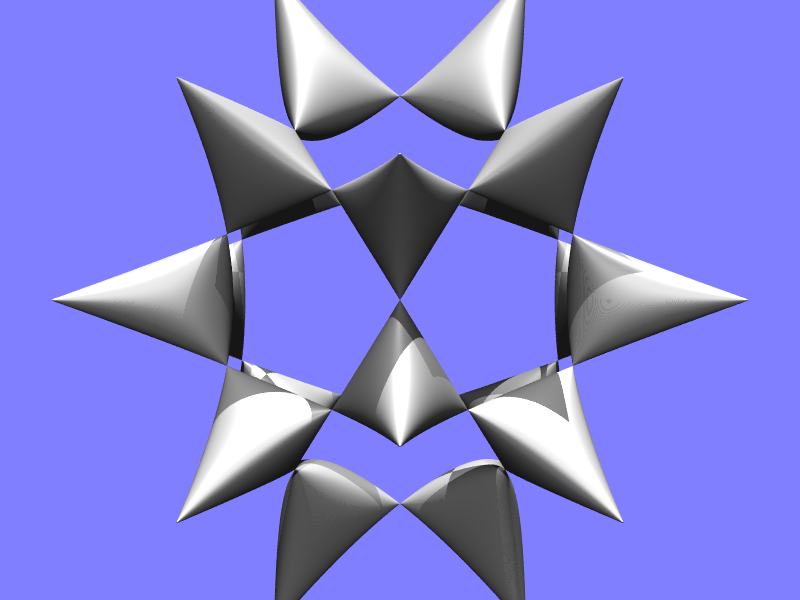
Real ordinary double points of the Barth Sextic.

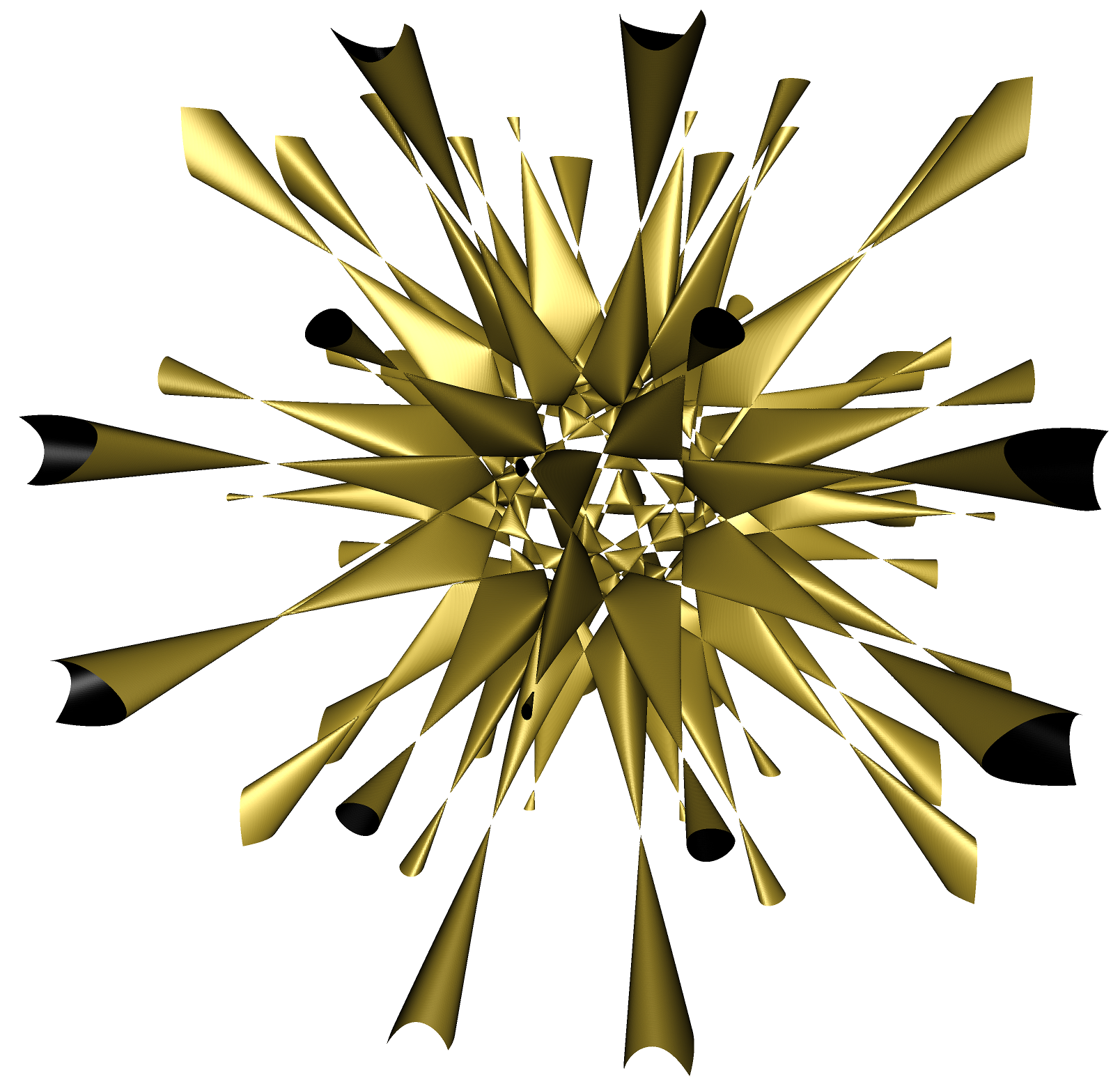
Barth Decic

In algebraic geometry, a Barth surface is one of the complex nodal surfaces in 3 dimensions with large numbers of double points found by Wolf Barth (1996). Two examples are the Barth sextic of degree 6 with 65 double points, and the Barth decic of degree 10 with 345 double points.

For degree 6 surfaces in P^{3}, David Jaffe and Daniel Ruberman (1997) showed that 65 is the maximum number of double points possible. The Barth sextic is a counterexample to an incorrect claim by Francesco Severi in 1946 that 52 is the maximum number of double points possible.

== Informal accounting of the 65 ordinary double points of the Barth sextic ==
The Barth sextic may be visualized in three dimensions as featuring 50 finite and 15 infinite ordinary double points (nodes).

Referring to the figure, the 50 finite ordinary double points are arrayed as the vertices of 20 roughly tetrahedral shapes oriented such that the bases of these four-sided "outward pointing" shapes form the triangular faces of a regular icosidodecahedron. To these 30 icosidodecahedral vertices are added the summit vertices of the 20 tetrahedral shapes. These 20 points themselves are the vertices of a concentric regular dodecahedron circumscribed about the inner icosidodecahedron. Together, these are the 50 finite ordinary double points of the figure.

The 15 remaining ordinary double points at infinity correspond to the 15 lines that pass through the opposite vertices of the inscribed icosidodecahedron, all 15 of which also intersect in the center of the figure. (Baez 2016).

== See also ==
- Endrass surface
- Sarti surface
- Togliatti surface
- List of algebraic surfaces
