= Hopf manifold =

In complex geometry, a Hopf manifold (Hopf 1948) is obtained as a quotient of the complex vector space (with zero deleted) $({\mathbb C}^n\backslash 0)$ by a free action of the group $\Gamma \cong {\mathbb Z}$ of integers, with the generator $\gamma$ of $\Gamma$ acting by holomorphic contractions. Here, a holomorphic contraction is a map $\gamma:\; {\mathbb C}^n \to {\mathbb C}^n$ such that a sufficiently big iteration $\;\gamma^N$ maps any given compact subset of ${\mathbb C}^n$ onto an arbitrarily small neighbourhood of 0.

Two-dimensional Hopf manifolds are called Hopf surfaces.

== Examples ==
In a typical situation, $\Gamma$ is generated by a linear contraction, usually a diagonal matrix $q\cdot Id$, with $q\in {\mathbb C}$ a complex number, $0<|q|<1$. Such manifold is called a classical Hopf manifold.

== Properties ==
A Hopf manifold $H:=({\mathbb C}^n\backslash 0)/{\mathbb Z}$ is diffeomorphic to $S^{2n-1}\times S^1$. For $n\geq 2$, it is non-Kähler. In fact, it is not even symplectic because the second cohomology group is zero.

== Hypercomplex structure ==
Even-dimensional Hopf manifolds admit hypercomplex structure. The Hopf surface is the only compact hypercomplex manifold of quaternionic dimension 1 which is not hyperkähler.
