= Catanese surface =

In mathematics, a Catanese surface is one of the surfaces of general type introduced by Fabrizio Catanese (1981).

== Construction ==
The construction starts with a quintic V with 20 double points. Let W be the surface obtained by blowing up the 20 double points. Suppose that W has a double cover X branched over the 20 exceptional −2-curves. Let Y be obtained from X by blowing down the 20 −1-curves in X. If there is a group of order 5 acting freely on all these surfaces, then the quotient Z of Y by this group of order 5 is a Catanese surface. Catanese found a 4-dimensional family of curves constructed like this.

== Invariants ==
The Catanese surface is a numerical Campedelli surface and hence has Hodge diamond

		1
	0		0
0		8		0
	0		0
		1

and canonical degree $K^2 = 2$. The fundamental group of the Catanese surface is $\mathbf{Z}/5\mathbf{Z}$, as can be seen from its quotient construction.
