= Siegel modular variety =

Algebraic variety that is a moduli space for principally polarized abelian varieties

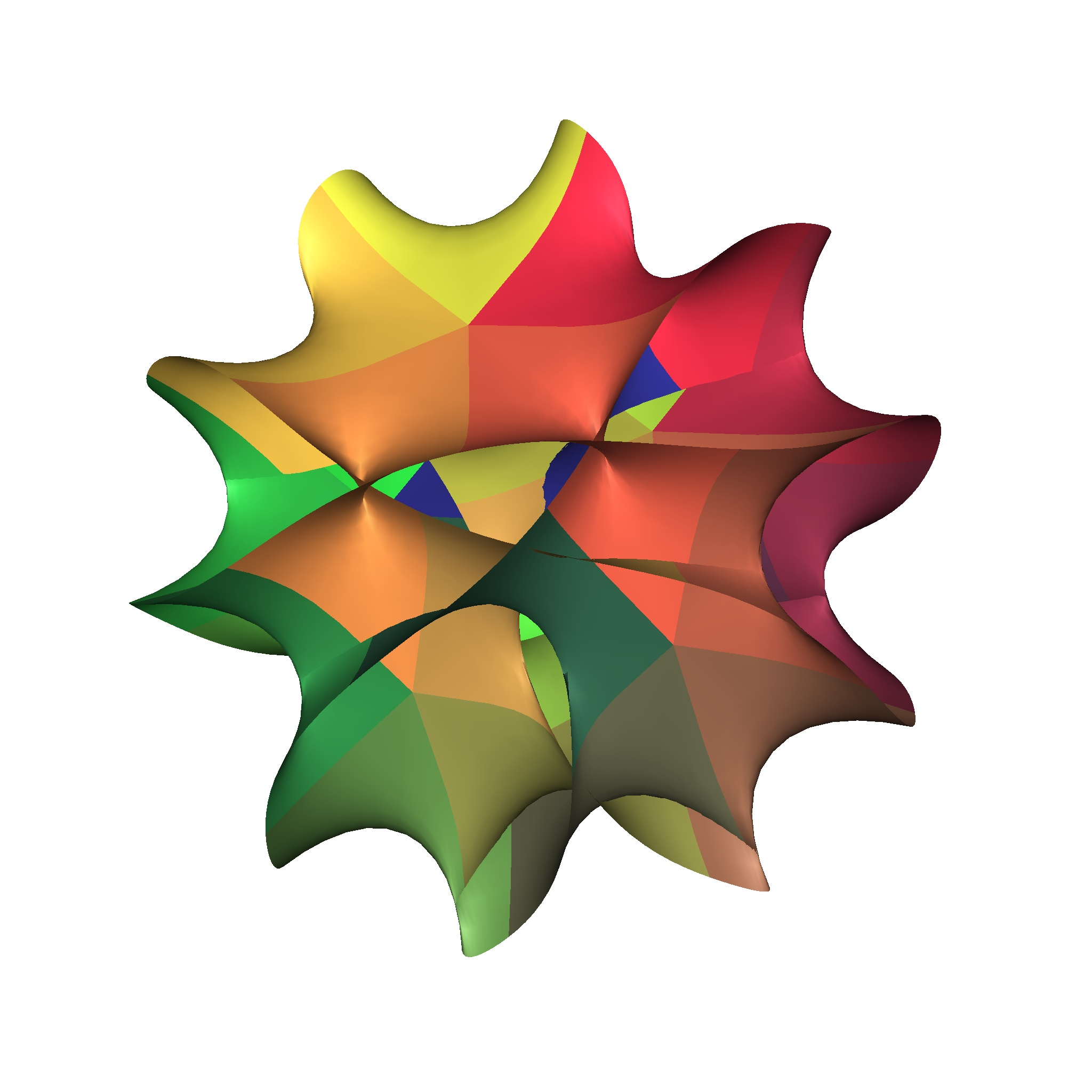
A 2D slice of a Calabi–Yau quintic. One such quintic is birationally equivalent to the compactification of the Siegel modular variety A_{1,3}(2).

In mathematics, a Siegel modular variety or Siegel moduli space is an algebraic variety that parametrizes certain types of abelian varieties of a fixed dimension. More precisely, Siegel modular varieties are the moduli spaces of principally polarized abelian varieties of a fixed dimension. They are named after Carl Ludwig Siegel, the 20th-century German number theorist who introduced the varieties in 1943.

Siegel modular varieties are the most basic examples of Shimura varieties. Siegel modular varieties generalize moduli spaces of elliptic curves to higher dimensions and play a central role in the theory of Siegel modular forms, which generalize classical modular forms to higher dimensions. They also have applications to black hole entropy and conformal field theory.

== Construction ==
The Siegel modular variety A_{g}, which parametrize principally polarized abelian varieties of dimension g, can be constructed as the complex analytic spaces constructed as the quotient of the Siegel upper half-space of degree g by the action of a symplectic group. Complex analytic spaces have naturally associated algebraic varieties by Serre's GAGA.

The Siegel modular variety A_{g}(n), which parametrize principally polarized abelian varieties of dimension g with a level n-structure, arises as the quotient of the Siegel upper half-space by the action of the principal congruence subgroup of level n of a symplectic group.

A Siegel modular variety may also be constructed as a Shimura variety defined by the Shimura datum associated to a symplectic vector space.

== Properties ==
The Siegel modular variety A_{g} has dimension g(g + 1)/2. Furthermore, it was shown by Yung-Sheng Tai, Eberhard Freitag, and David Mumford that A_{g} is of general type when g ≥ 7.

Siegel modular varieties can be compactified to obtain projective varieties. In particular, a compactification of A_{2}(2) is birationally equivalent to the Segre cubic which is in fact rational. Similarly, a compactification of A_{2}(3) is birationally equivalent to the Burkhardt quartic which is also rational. Another Siegel modular variety, denoted A_{1,3}(2), has a compactification that is birationally equivalent to the Barth–Nieto quintic which is birationally equivalent to a modular Calabi–Yau manifold with Kodaira dimension zero.

Siegel modular varieties cannot be anabelian.

== Applications ==
Siegel modular forms arise as vector-valued differential forms on Siegel modular varieties. Siegel modular varieties have been used in conformal field theory via the theory of Siegel modular forms. In string theory, the function that naturally captures the microstates of black hole entropy in the D1D5P system of supersymmetric black holes is a Siegel modular form.

In 1968, Aleksei Parshin showed that the Mordell conjecture (now known as Faltings' theorem) would hold if the Shafarevich finiteness conjecture was true by introducing Parshin's trick. In 1983 and 1984, Gerd Faltings completed the proof of the Mordell conjecture by proving the Shafarevich finiteness conjecture. The main idea of Faltings' proof is the comparison of Faltings heights and naive heights via Siegel modular varieties.

== See also ==
- Hilbert modular surface
- Hilbert scheme
- Jacobian variety
