= Igusa quartic =

In algebraic geometry, the Igusa quartic (also called the Castelnuovo–Richmond quartic CR_{4} or the Castelnuovo–Richmond–Igusa quartic) is a quartic hypersurface in 4-dimensional projective space, studied by Igusa (1962). It is closely related to the moduli space of genus 2 curves with level 2 structure. It is the dual of the Segre cubic.

It can be given as a codimension 2 variety in P^{5} by the equations

$$\sum x_i=0$$
$$\big(\sum x_i^2\big)^2 = 4 \sum x_i^4$$
