= Cremona–Richmond configuration =

The Cremona–Richmond configuration

In mathematics, the Cremona–Richmond configuration is a configuration of 15 lines and 15 points, having 3 points on each line and 3 lines through each point, and containing no (non-degenerate) triangles. It was studied by Cremona (1877) and Richmond (1900). It is a generalized quadrangle with parameters (2,2). Its Levi graph is the Tutte–Coxeter graph.

== Symmetry ==
The points of the Cremona–Richmond configuration may be identified with the $15=\tbinom{6}{2}$ unordered pairs of elements of a six-element set; these pairs are called duads. Similarly, the lines of the configuration may be identified with the 15 ways of partitioning the same six elements into three pairs; these partitions are called synthemes. Identified in this way, a point of the configuration is incident to a line of the configuration if and only if the duad corresponding to the point is one of the three pairs in the syntheme corresponding to the line.

The symmetric group of all permutations of the six elements underlying this system of duads and synthemes acts as a symmetry group of the Cremona–Richmond configuration, and gives the automorphism group of the configuration. Every flag of the configuration (an incident point-line pair) can be taken to every other flag by a symmetry in this group.

The Cremona–Richmond configuration is self-dual: it is possible to exchange points for lines while preserving all the incidences of the configuration. This duality gives the Tutte–Coxeter graph additional symmetries beyond those of the Cremona–Richmond configuration, which swap the two sides of its bipartition. These symmetries correspond to the outer automorphisms of the symmetric group on six elements.

== Realization ==
Any six points in general position in four-dimensional space determine 15 points where a line through two of the points intersects the hyperplane through the other four points; thus, the duads of the six points correspond one-for-one with these 15 derived points. Any three duads that together form a syntheme determine a line, the intersection line of the three hyperplanes containing two of the three duads in the syntheme, and this line contains each of the points derived from its three duads. Thus, the duads and synthemes of the abstract configuration correspond one-for-one, in an incidence-preserving way, with these 15 points and 15 lines derived from the original six points, which form a realization of the configuration. The same realization may be projected into Euclidean space or the Euclidean plane.

The Cremona–Richmond configuration also has a one-parameter family of realizations in the plane with order-five cyclic symmetry.

== History ==
Ludwig Schläfli (1858, 1863) found cubic surfaces containing sets of 15 real lines (complementary to a Schläfli double six in the set of all 27 lines on a cubic) and 15 tangent planes, with three lines in each plane and three planes through each line. Intersecting these lines and planes by another plane results in a 15_{3}15_{3} configuration. The specific incidence pattern of Schläfli's lines and planes was later published by Luigi Cremona (1868). The observation that the resulting configuration contains no triangles was made by Martinetti (1886), and the same configuration also appears in the work of Herbert William Richmond (1900). Visconti (1916) found a description of the configuration as a self-inscribed polygon. H. F. Baker used the four-dimensional realization of this configuration as the frontispiece for two volumes of his 1922–1925 textbook, Principles of Geometry. Zacharias (1951) also rediscovered the same configuration, and found a realization of it with order-five cyclic symmetry.

The name of the configuration comes from the studies of it by Cremona (1868, 1877) and Richmond (1900); perhaps due to some mistakes in his work, the contemporaneous contribution of Martinetti fell into obscurity.
