= Fedor Bogomolov =

Russian and American mathematician

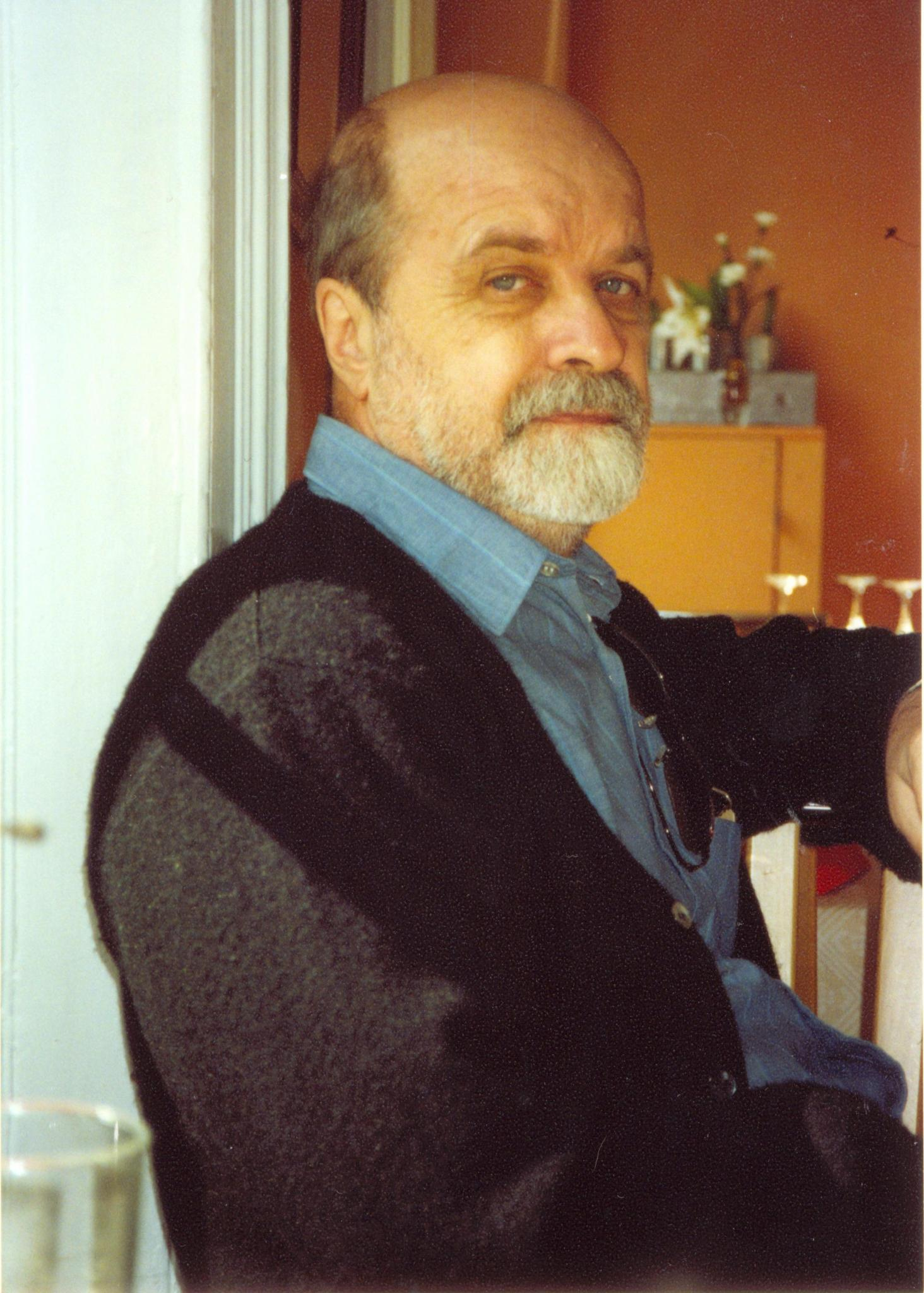
Fedor Bogomolov.

Fedor Alekseyevich Bogomolov (born 26 September 1946) (Фёдор Алексеевич Богомолов) is a Russian and American mathematician, known for his research in algebraic geometry and number theory. Bogomolov worked at the Steklov Institute in Moscow before he became a professor at the Courant Institute in New York. He is most famous for his pioneering work on hyperkähler manifolds.

Born in Moscow, Bogomolov graduated from Moscow State University, Faculty of Mechanics and Mathematics, and earned his doctorate ("candidate degree") in 1973, at the Steklov Institute. His doctoral advisor was Sergei Novikov.

== Geometry of Kähler manifolds ==
Bogomolov's Ph.D. thesis was entitled Compact Kähler varieties. In his early papers Bogomolov studied the manifolds which were later called Calabi–Yau and hyperkähler. He proved a decomposition theorem, used for the classification of manifolds with trivial canonical class. It has been re-proven using the Calabi–Yau theorem and Berger's classification of Riemannian holonomies, and is foundational for modern string theory.

In the late 1970s and early 1980s Bogomolov studied the deformation theory for manifolds with trivial canonical class. He discovered what is now known as Bogomolov–Tian–Todorov theorem, proving the smoothness and un-obstructedness of the deformation space for hyperkähler manifolds (in 1978 paper) and then extended this to all Calabi–Yau manifolds in the 1981 IHES preprint. Some years later, this theorem became the mathematical foundation for Mirror Symmetry.

While studying the deformation theory of hyperkähler manifolds, Bogomolov discovered what is now known as the Bogomolov–Beauville–Fujiki form on $H^2(M)$. Studying properties of this form, Bogomolov erroneously concluded that compact hyperkaehler manifolds do not exist, with the exception of K3 surfaces, tori, and their products. Almost four years passed since this publication before Akira Fujiki found a counterexample.

== Other works in algebraic geometry ==
Bogomolov's paper on "Holomorphic tensors and vector bundles on projective manifolds" proves what is now known as the Bogomolov–Miyaoka–Yau inequality, and also proves that a stable bundle on a surface, restricted to a curve of sufficiently big degree, remains stable. In "Families of curves on a surface of general type", Bogomolov laid the foundations to the now popular approach to the theory of diophantine equations through geometry of hyperbolic manifolds and dynamical systems. In this paper Bogomolov proved that on any surface of general type with $c_1^2>c_2$, there is only a finite number of curves of bounded genus. Some 25 years later, Michael McQuillan extended this argument to prove the famous Green–Griffiths conjecture for such surfaces. In "Classification of surfaces of class $VII_0$ with $b_{2}=0$", Bogomolov made the first step in a famously difficult (and still unresolved) problem of classification of surfaces of Kodaira class VII. These are compact complex surfaces with $b_2=1$. If they are in addition minimal, they are called class $VII_0$. Kunihiko Kodaira classified all compact complex surfaces except class VII, which are still not understood, except the case $b_{2}=0$ (Bogomolov) and $b_{2}=1$ (Andrei Teleman, 2005).

== Later career ==
Bogomolov obtained his Habilitation (Russian "Dr. of Sciences") in 1983. In 1994, he emigrated to the United States and became a full professor at the Courant Institute. He is very active in algebraic geometry and number theory. From 2009 till March 2014 he served as the Editor-in-Chief of the Central European Journal of Mathematics. Since 2014 he serves as the Editor-in-Chief of the European Journal of Mathematics. Since 2010 he is the academic supervisor of the HSE Laboratory of algebraic geometry and its applications. Bogomolov has extensively contributed to the revival of Russian mathematics. Three major international conferences commemorating his 70th birthday were held in 2016: at the Courant Institute, the University of Nottingham, and the Higher School of Economics in Moscow.

== See also ==
- Bogomolov–Sommese vanishing theorem
