= Togliatti surface =

Object in algebraic geometry

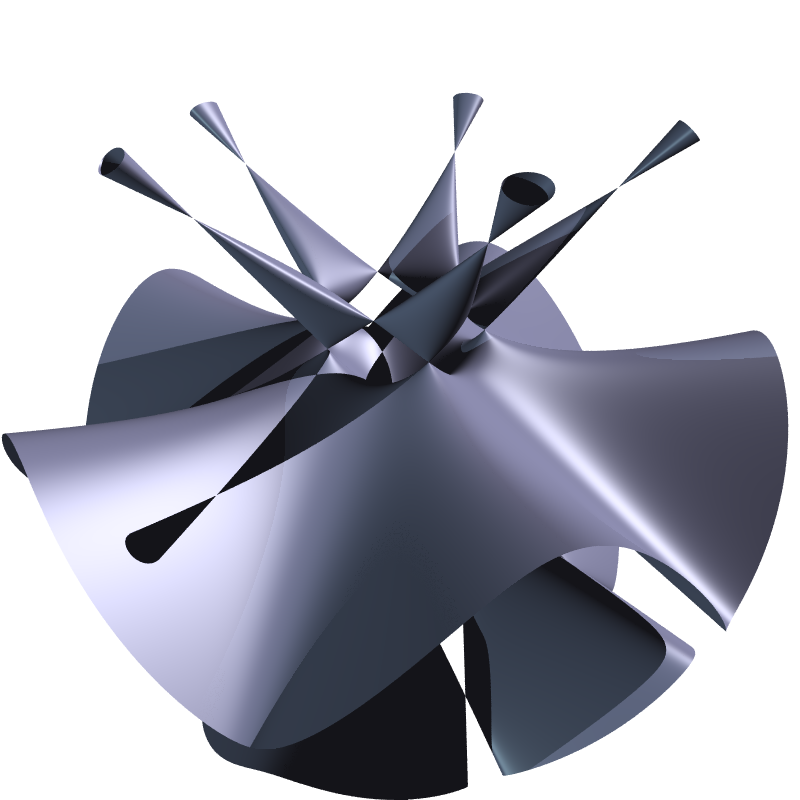
The surface with w = 1 (real points, bounded by a sphere with radius=6).

3D model of same surface as above (w = 1) bounded by the cube [-10, 10]^{3}

In algebraic geometry, a Togliatti surface is a nodal surface of degree five with 31 nodes. The first examples were constructed by Eugenio G. Togliatti (1940). Arnaud Beauville (1980) proved that 31 is the maximum possible number of nodes for a surface of this degree, showing this example to be optimal.

== See also ==
- Barth surface
- Endrass surface
- Sarti surface
- List of algebraic surfaces
