= Herbert William Richmond =

English mathematician (1863–1948)

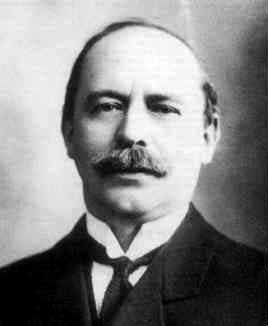
- Born: 17 July 1863; Tottenham, England
- Died: 22 April 1948 (aged 84); Cambridge, England
- Occupation: Mathematician
- Known for: Studies on the Cremona–Richmond configuration

Herbert William Richmond (17 July 1863 – 22 April 1948) was an English mathematician who studied the Cremona–Richmond configuration. One of his most popular works is an exact construction of the regular heptadecagon in 1893 (which was calculated before by Carl Friedrich Gauss).

Herbert was born on 17 July 1863 in Tottenham, England. He was elected as a Fellow of the Royal Society in 1911. On 22 April 1948, Herbert died in Cambridge, England.

The Richmond surface is named after him.
