= Bogomolov–Tian–Todorov theorem =

In deformation theory, the Bogomolov–Tian–Todorov theorem states that a compact Kähler manifold with trivial canonical bundle has unobstructed deformations. An algebraic generalization states that, for a smooth projective variety over a field of characteristic zero, the injectivity of the contraction map on cohomology

$$H^*(X,\Theta_X)\xrightarrow{i}\operatorname{Hom}^*\bigl(H^*(X,\Omega_X^n),H^*(X,\Omega_X^{n-1})\bigr)$$

implies that its deformations are unobstructed. The theorem is named after the mathematicians Fedor Bogomolov, Tian Gang and Andrey Todorov.

More precisely, the Bogomolov–Tian–Todorov theorem say, if $X$ is a compact Kähler manifold with

$$K_X\cong\mathcal O_X,$$

then every infinitesimal deformation can be extended to higher orders.

An algebraic formulation is: let $X$ be a smooth projective variety of dimension $n$ over an algebraically closed field $K$ with characteristic zero and denote its tangent sheaf as $\Theta_X$, then if the contraction map

$$H^*(X,\Theta_X)\xrightarrow{i}\operatorname{Hom}^*\bigl(H^*(X,\Omega_X^n),H^*(X,\Omega_X^{n-1})\bigr)$$

is injective, then for every affine open cover $\mathcal U=\{U_i\}$ of $X$, the $L_\infty$-algebra given by the Čech complex $\check C(\mathcal U,\Theta_X)$ is quasi-abelian, i.e. quasi-isomorphic to an abelian $L_\infty$-algebra. Consequently the deformations of $X$ are unobstructed.

In particular, if the canonical bundle of $X$ is trivial or torsion, then the $L_\infty$-algebra $\check C(\mathcal U,\Theta_X)$ is quasi-abelian.

The classical theorem follows from the general version, as the triviality of the canonical bundle $K_X\cong\mathcal O_X$ is a sufficient condition for the injectivity of the contraction map.
