= Eugenio Giuseppe Togliatti =

Italian mathematician (1890–1977)

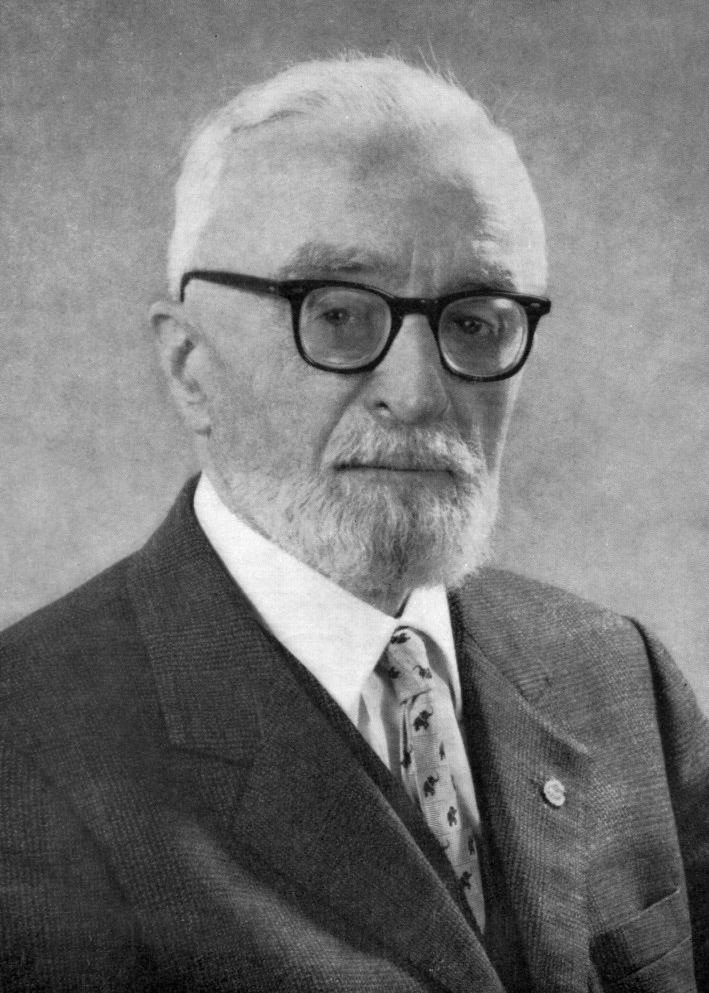
- Born: 3 November 1890; Orbassano, Piedmont, Italy
- Died: 5 October 1977 (aged 86); Genoa, Liguria, Italy
- Known for: Togliatti surfaces
- Scientific career
- Fields: Mathematics

Eugenio Giuseppe Togliatti (3 November 1890 – 5 October 1977) was an Italian mathematician, the brother of politician Palmiro Togliatti. He was a researcher at the ETH Zurich from 1924 to 1926. He discovered Togliatti surfaces.
