= Supersingular K3 surface =

Mathematical surface

In algebraic geometry, a supersingular K3 surface is a K3 surface over a field k of characteristic p > 0 such that the slopes of Frobenius on the crystalline cohomology H^{2}(X,W(k)) are all equal to 1. These have also been called Artin supersingular K3 surfaces. Supersingular K3 surfaces can be considered the most special and interesting of all K3 surfaces.

== Definitions and main results ==
More generally, a smooth projective variety X over a field of characteristic p > 0 is called supersingular if all slopes of Frobenius on the crystalline cohomology H^{a}(X,W(k)) are equal to a/2, for all a. In particular, this gives the standard notion of a supersingular abelian variety. For a variety X over a finite field F_{q}, it is equivalent to say that the eigenvalues of Frobenius on the l-adic cohomology H^{a}(X,Q_{l}) are equal to q^{a/2} times roots of unity. It follows that any variety in positive characteristic whose l-adic cohomology is generated by algebraic cycles is supersingular.

A K3 surface whose l-adic cohomology is generated by algebraic cycles is sometimes called a Shioda supersingular K3 surface. Since the second Betti number of a K3 surface is always 22, this property means that the surface has 22 independent elements in its Picard group (ρ = 22). From what we have said, a K3 surface with Picard number 22 must be supersingular.

Conversely, the Tate conjecture would imply that every supersingular K3 surface over an algebraically closed field has Picard number 22. This is now known in every characteristic p except 2, since the Tate conjecture was proved for all K3 surfaces in characteristic p at least 3 by Nygaard-Ogus (1985), Maulik (2014), Charles (2013), and Madapusi Pera (2013).

To see that K3 surfaces with Picard number 22 exist only in positive characteristic, one can use Hodge theory to prove that the Picard number of a K3 surface in characteristic zero is at most 20. In fact the Hodge diamond for any complex K3 surface is the same (see classification), and the middle row reads 1, 20, 1. In other words, h^{2,0} and h^{0,2} both take the value 1, with h^{1,1} = 20. Therefore, the dimension of the space spanned by the algebraic cycles is at most 20 in characteristic zero; surfaces with this maximum value are sometimes called singular K3 surfaces.

Another phenomenon which can only occur in positive characteristic is that a K3 surface may be unirational. Michael Artin observed that every unirational K3 surface over an algebraically closed field must have Picard number 22. (In particular, a unirational K3 surface must be supersingular.) Conversely, Artin conjectured that every K3 surface with Picard number 22 must be unirational. Artin's conjecture was proved in characteristic 2 by Rudakov & Shafarevich (1978). Proofs in every characteristic p at least 5 were claimed by Liedtke (2013) and Lieblich (2014), but later refuted by Bragg & Lieblich (2022).

== History ==
The first example of a K3 surface with Picard number 22 was given by Tate (1965), who observed that the Fermat quartic

w^{4} + x^{4} + y^{4} + z^{4} = 0

has Picard number 22 over algebraically closed fields of characteristic 3 mod 4. Then Shioda showed that the elliptic modular surface of level 4 (the universal generalized elliptic curve E(4) → X(4)) in characteristic 3 mod 4 is a K3 surface with Picard number 22, as is the Kummer surface of the product of two supersingular elliptic curves in odd characteristic. Shimada (2004, 2004b) showed that all K3 surfaces with Picard number 22 are double covers of the projective plane. In the case of characteristic 2 the double cover may need to be an inseparable covering.

The discriminant of the intersection form on the Picard group of a K3 surface with Picard number 22 is an even power

p^{2e}

of the characteristic p, as was shown by Artin and Milne. Here e is called the Artin invariant of the K3 surface. Artin showed that

1 ≤ e ≤ 10.

There is a corresponding Artin stratification of the moduli spaces of supersingular K3 surfaces, which have dimension 9. The subspace of supersingular K3 surfaces with Artin invariant e has dimension e − 1.

== Examples ==
In characteristic 2,

z^{2} = f(x, y) ,

for a sufficiently general polynomial f(x, y) of degree 6, defines a surface with 21 isolated singularities. The smooth projective minimal model of such a surface is a unirational K3 surface, and hence a K3 surface with Picard number 22. The largest Artin invariant here is 10.

Similarly, in characteristic 3,

z^{3} = g(x, y) ,

for a sufficiently general polynomial g(x, y) of degree 4, defines a surface with 9 isolated singularities. The smooth projective minimal model of such a surface is again a unirational K3 surface, and hence a K3 surface with Picard number 22. The highest Artin invariant in this family is 6.

Dolgachev & Kondō (2003) described the supersingular K3 surface in characteristic 2 with Artin number 1 in detail.

== Kummer surfaces ==
If the characteristic p is greater than 2, Ogus (1979) showed that every K3 surface S with Picard number 22 and Artin invariant at most 2 is a Kummer surface, meaning the minimal resolution of the quotient of an abelian surface A by the mapping x ↦ − x. More precisely, A is a supersingular abelian surface, isogenous to the product of two supersingular elliptic curves.

== See also ==
- K3 surface
- Tate conjecture
