= Davide Giordano =

Italian surgeon, historian of medicine and politician

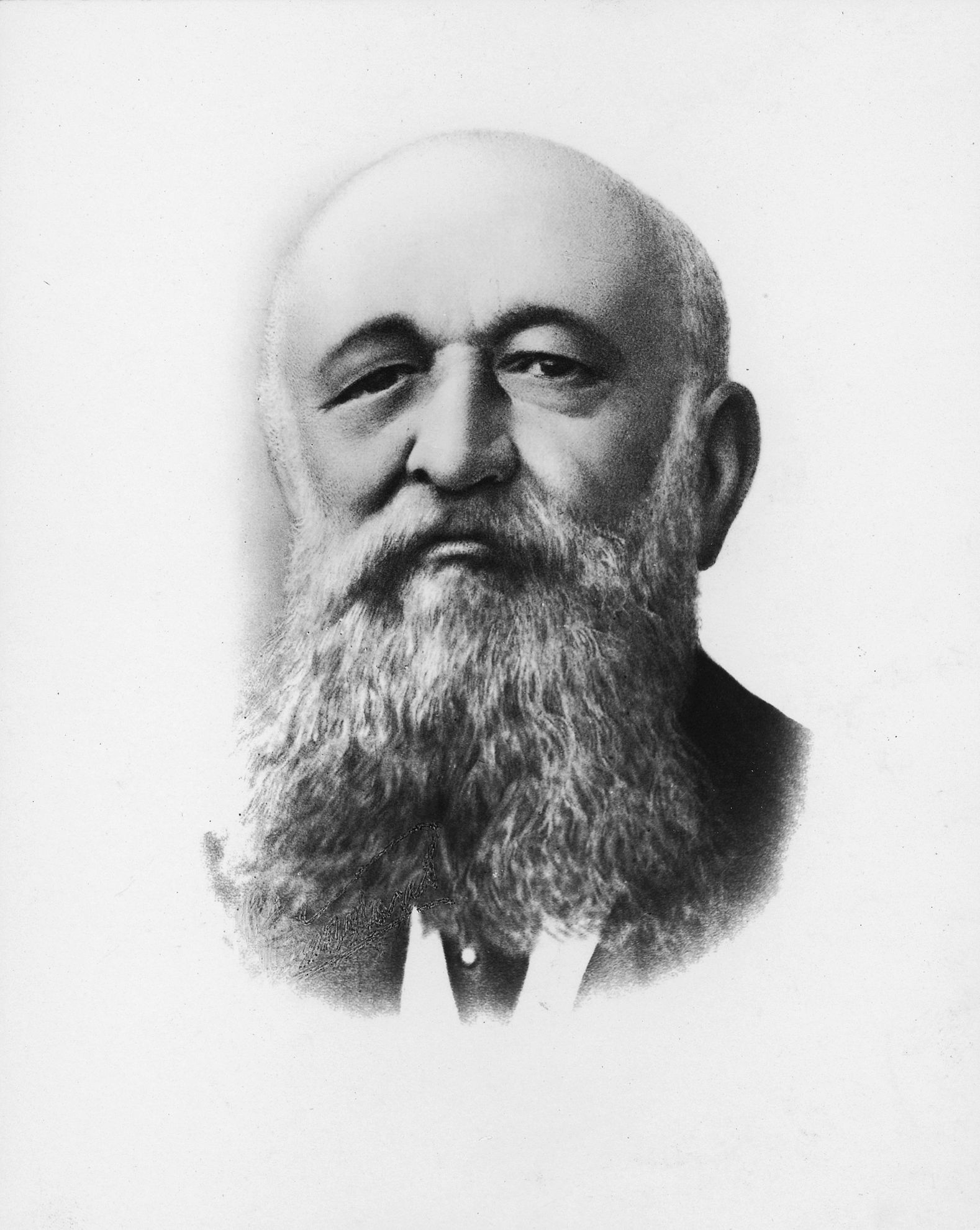
Davide Giordano circa 1900

Davide Giordano (22 March 1864 Courmayeur – 1 February 1954 Venice) was an Italian surgeon historian of medicine and politician.

He came from a Waldensian family originally from Torre Pellice, the son of Giacomo and Susetta Hugon.

He was president of Ateneo Veneto, Venice's Institute of Science, Literature and Arts, multiple times (1919 - 1921, 1925 - 1929, 1938 - 1942). He is noted for the proposition of the transglebellar-nasal approach to pituitary surgery, which was first practiced in 1909 in a patient with pituitary adenoma.

He was the head of a surgical department at a hospital in Venice from 1894 to 1934. During World War I, he was a consultant surgeon in the Third Army.

He was among the promoters of the Italian Society of the History of Medicine and he became its second president from 1923 to 1938. He was also president of the International Society for the History of Medicine from 1930 to 1936.

== Bibliography ==
- Stefano Arieti, "Davide Giordano", Dizionario Biografico degli Italiani - Volume 55 (2001)

Preceded by Ferruccio Truffi	26th President of Ateneo Veneto; 1919–1921	Succeeded by Giuseppe Jona
Preceded by Giuseppe Jona	President of Ateneo Veneto; 1925–1929	Succeeded by Giovanni Bordiga
