= Yoichi Miyaoka =

Japanese mathematician

Yoichi Miyaoka (宮岡 洋一, Miyaoka Yōichi) is a mathematician who works in algebraic geometry and who proved (independently of Shing-Tung Yau's work) the Bogomolov–Miyaoka–Yau inequality in an Inventiones Mathematicae paper.

In 1984, Miyaoka extended the Bogomolov–Miyaoka–Yau inequality to surfaces with quotient singularities, and in 2008 to orbifold surfaces. Doing so, he obtains sharp bound on the number of quotient singularities on surfaces of general type. Moreover, the inequality for orbifold surfaces gives explicit values for the coefficients of the so-called Lang-Vojta conjecture relating the degree of a curve on a surface with its geometric genus.
