= Giovanni Bordiga =

Italian mathematician (1854–1933)

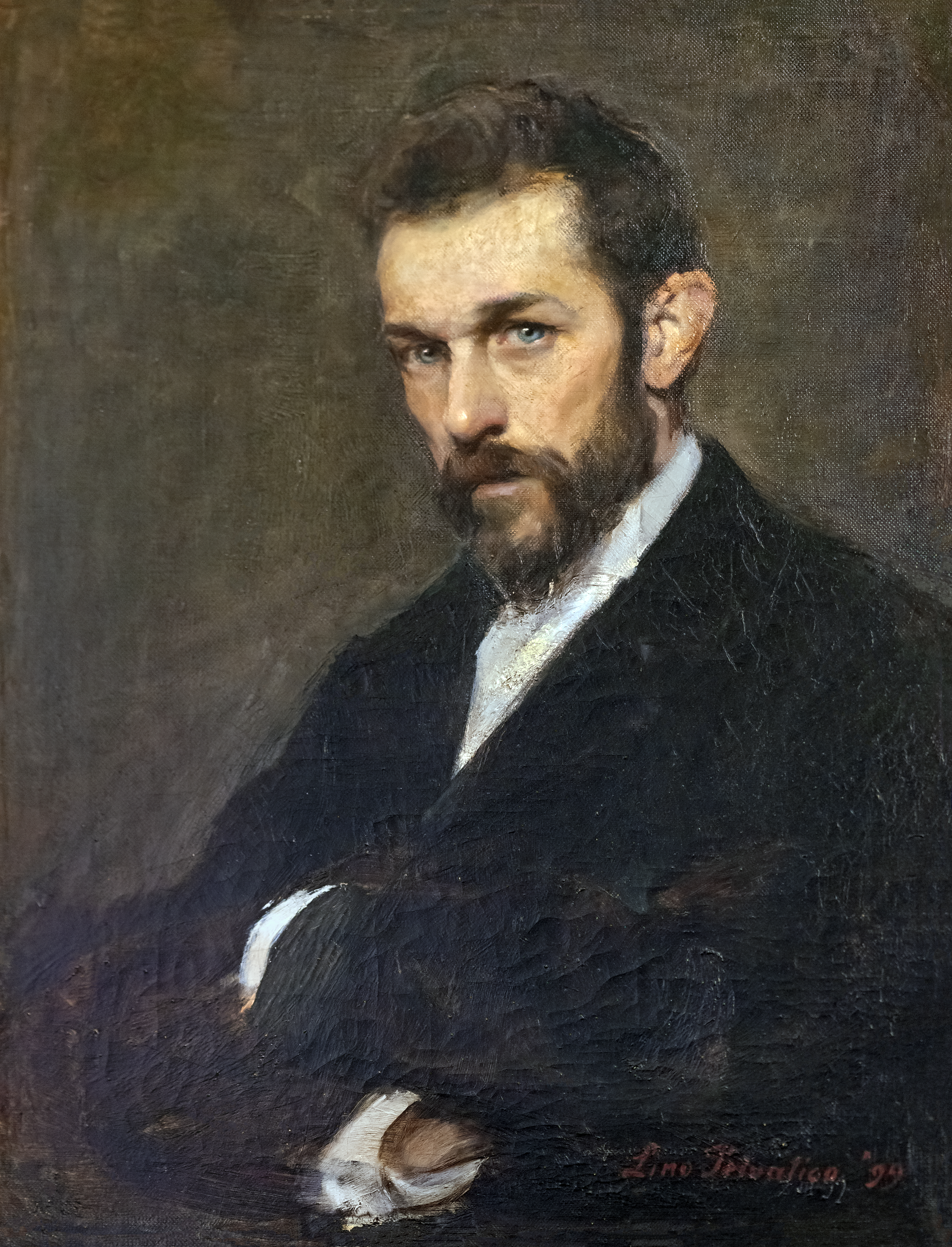
Giovanni Bordiga by Lino Selvatico

Giovanni Bordiga (2 April 1854 in Novara – 16 June 1933 in Venice) was an Italian mathematician who worked on algebraic and projective geometry at the university of Padua. He introduced the Bordiga surface.

Giovanni was the son of Carlo and Amalia Adami. He matriculated at a young age to Turin University, graduating in 1874 in civil engineering.

From 22 December 1929 until his death, he was president of the Ateneo Veneto of Science, Letters and Arts.

He was the paternal uncle of Italian Left Communist theorist Amadeo Bordiga.

== Biography ==
He was a professor of projective geometry at the University of Padua. His fame is mainly linked to his role as president of the Accademia di Belle Arti di Venezia. During his tenure, in December 1926, he founded the Università Iuav di Venezia, the second high school of architecture to be established in Italy.

An Art criticism and promoter of activities aimed at disseminating Venetian art, from 1920 to 1926 he was the first president of the Venice Biennale not to also hold the office of mayor of the city, while, as president of the Fondazione Querini Stampalia, in 1925 he oversaw the reorganization and refurbishment of several rooms in the museum , with particular attention to the art gallery, for which he edited the catalog.

Politically, he was a militant supporter of late Risorgimento radicalism, while his nephew Amadeo Bordiga was one of the founders of the Italian Communist Party.

The city of Padua has named a street after him.

== Bibliography ==
- Bosisio, Achille (1966), "Gabriele D'Annunzio e Giovanni Bordiga", Quaderni Dannunziani, vol. 34–35, Fondazione Il Vittoriale degli Italiani, p. 611

Preceded by Davide Giordano	28th President of Ateneo Veneto; 1929–1933	Succeeded by Luigi Marangoni
