= Horikawa surface =

One of the surfaces of general type introduced by Eiji Horikawa

In mathematics, a Horikawa surface is one of the surfaces of general type introduced by Eiji Horikawa.

These are surfaces with q = 0 and p_{g} = c_{1}^{2}/2 + 2 or c_{1}^{2}/2 + 3/2 (which implies that they are more or less on the Noether line edge of the region of possible values of the Chern numbers).

They are all simply connected, and Horikawa gave a detailed description of them.
