= Castelnuovo surface =

In mathematics, a Castelnuovo surface is a surface of general type such that the canonical bundle is very ample and such that c_{1}^{2} = 3p_{g} − 7. Guido Castelnuovo proved that if the canonical bundle is very ample for a surface of general type then c_{1}^{2} ≥ 3p_{g} − 7.
