= Endrass surface =

Mathematical object in algebraic geometry

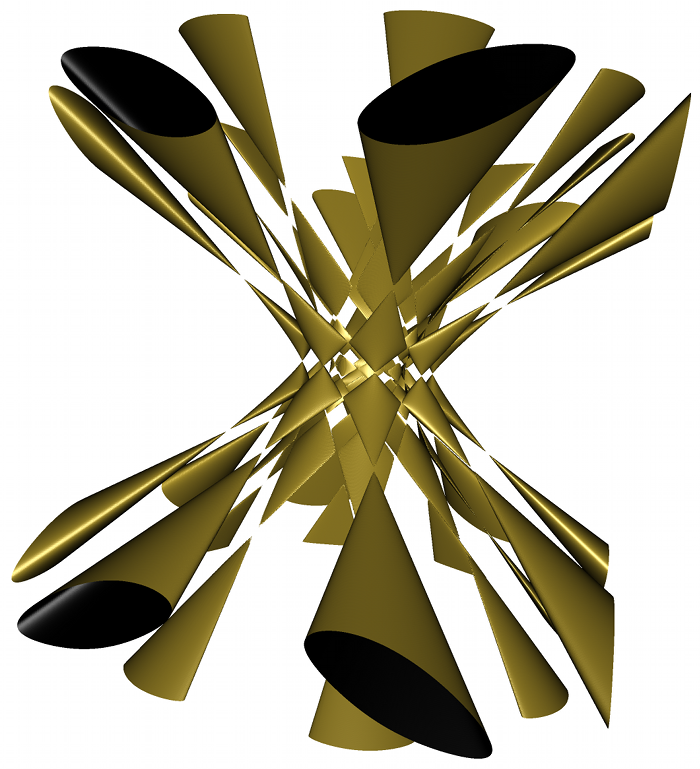

In algebraic geometry, an Endrass surface is a nodal surface of degree 8 with 168 real nodes, found by Stephan Endrass (1997). This is the most real nodes known for its degree; however, the best proven upper bound, 174, does not match the lower bound given by this surface.

== See also ==
- Barth surface
- Sarti surface
- Togliatti surface
