= White surface =

In algebraic geometry, a White surface is one of the rational surfaces in P^{n} studied by White (1923), generalizing cubic surfaces and Bordiga surfaces, which are the cases n = 3 or 4.

A White surface in P^{n} is given by the embedding of P^{2} blown up in n(n + 1)/2 points by the linear system of degree n curves through these points.
