= Lucien Godeaux =

Belgian mathematician

Lucien Godeaux (1887–1975) was a prolific Belgian mathematician. His total of more than 1000 papers and books, 644 of which are found in Mathematical Reviews, made him one of the most published mathematicians. He was the sole author of all but one of his papers.

He is best remembered for work in algebraic geometry. From Liège, he was attracted to the work of the Italian school of algebraic geometry by the work of one of its masters, Federigo Enriques. Godeaux went to Bologna to study with him. The Godeaux surface is a construction of a special type, which has subsequently been much studied.

Since 2007, the Belgian Mathematical Society (BMS) is organising a "Godeaux lecture" in his memory.

== Works ==
- Les transformations birationnelles du plan (1927)
- La Géométrie (1931)
- Leçons de géométrie projective (1933)
- Questions non résolues de géométrie algébrique : les involutions de l'espace et les variétés algébriques à trois dimensions (1933)
- Les surfaces algébriques non rationnelles de genres arithmétique et géométrique nuls (1934)
- La théorie des surfaces et l'espace réglé (géométrie projective différentielle) (1934)
- Les transformations birationnelles de l'espace (1934)
- Les involutions cycliques appartenant à une surface algébrique (1935)
- Les géométries (1937)
- Observations sur les variétés algébraiques à trois dimensions sur lesquelles l'opération d'adjonction est périodique (1940)
- Introduction à la géométrie supérieure (1946)
- Analyse mathématique (1946)
- Géométrie algébrique I. Transformations birationnelles et géométrie hyperespatielle
- Géométrie algébrique II. Géométrie sur une courbe algébrique, du plan (1949)
- Correspondances entre deux courbes algébriques (1949)
- Leçons de geometrie analytique à trois dimensions

== Sources ==
- Lucien Godeaux, Biographie nationale publiée par l'Académie royale de Belgique, 27 (1938)
- Hommage au Professeur Lucien Godeaux. Librairie Universitaire, Louvain, 1968
