= Cubic threefold =

Hyperspace in algebraic geometry

In algebraic geometry, a cubic threefold is a hypersurface of degree 3 in 4-dimensional projective space. Cubic threefolds are all unirational, but Clemens & Griffiths (1972) used intermediate Jacobians to show that non-singular cubic threefolds are not rational. The space of lines on a non-singular cubic 3-fold is a Fano surface.

Geometric invariant theory (GIT) gives a moduli space of smooth cubic threefolds, with one point for each isomorphism class of smooth cubic threefolds. Allcock (2003) compactified this moduli space by means of the GIT quotient of all polystable cubic forms in 5 variables. In particular, this compactification is isomorphic to the K-moduli space of cubic threefolds, as proven by Liu & Xu (2019).

== Examples ==
- Koras–Russell cubic threefold
- Klein cubic threefold
- Segre cubic
