= Segre cubic =

In algebraic geometry, the Segre cubic is a cubic threefold embedded in 4 (or sometimes 5) dimensional projective space, studied by Corrado Segre (1887).

== Definition ==
The Segre cubic is the set of points (x_{0}:x_{1}:x_{2}:x_{3}:x_{4}:x_{5}) of P^{5} satisfying the equations

$$\displaystyle x_0+x_1+x_2+x_3+x_4+x_5= 0$$
$$\displaystyle x_0^3+x_1^3+x_2^3+x_3^3+x_4^3+x_5^3 = 0.$$

== Properties ==
The intersection of the Segre cubic with any hyperplane x_{i} = 0 is the Clebsch cubic surface. Its intersection with any hyperplane x_{i} = x_{j} is Cayley's nodal cubic surface. Its dual is the Igusa quartic 3-fold in P^{4}. Its Hessian is the Barth–Nieto quintic. A cubic hypersurface in P^{4} has at most 10 nodes, and up to isomorphism the Segre cubic is the unique one with 10 nodes. Its nodes are the points conjugate to (1:1:1:−1:−1:−1) under permutations of coordinates.

The Segre cubic is rational and furthermore birationally equivalent to a compactification of the Siegel modular variety A_{2}(2).
