= Richmond surface =

Minimal surface in differential geometry

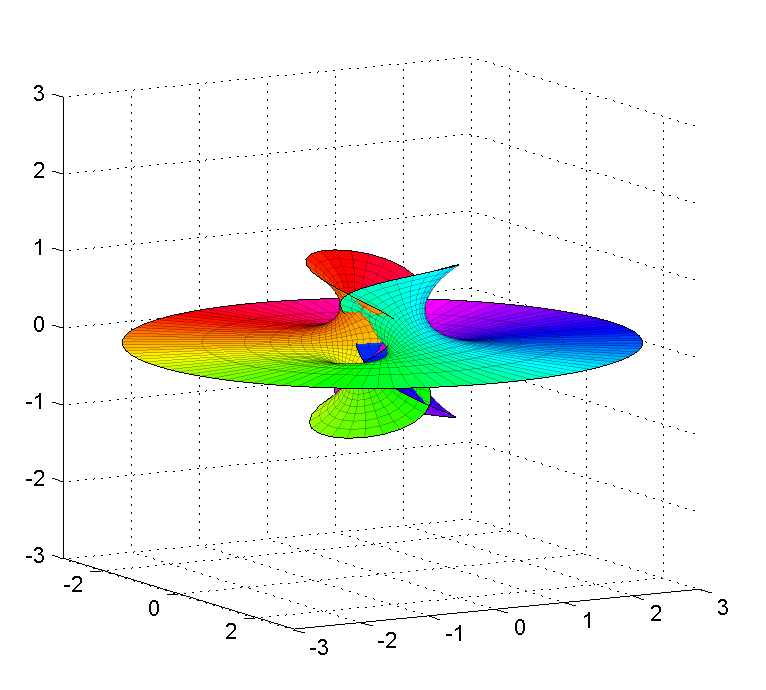
Richmond surface for m=2.

In differential geometry, a Richmond surface is a minimal surface first described by Herbert William Richmond in 1904. It is a family of surfaces with one planar end and one Enneper surface-like self-intersecting end.

It has Weierstrass–Enneper parameterization $f(z)=1/z^2, g(z)=z^m$. This allows a parametrization based on a complex parameter as

$$\begin{align}
X(z) &=  \Re[(-1/2z) - z^{2m+1}/(4m+2)]\\
Y(z) &=  \Re[(-i/2z) + i z^{2m+1}/(4m+2)]\\
Z(z) &=  \Re[z^m / m]
\end{align}$$

The associate family of the surface is just the surface rotated around the z-axis.

Taking m = 2 a real parametric expression becomes:

$$\begin{align}
X(u,v) &= (1/3)u^3 - uv^2 + \frac{u}{u^2+v^2}\\
Y(u,v) &= -u^2v + (1/3)v^3 - \frac{v}{u^2+v^2}\\
Z(u,v) &= 2u
\end{align}$$
