= Wolf Barth =

German mathematician (1942–2016)

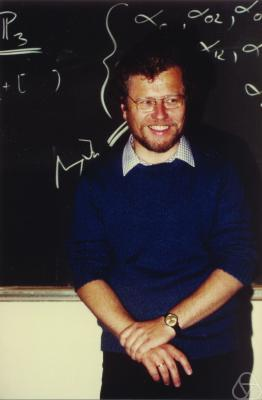
Wolf Barth at Dortmund in 1980 (photo from MFO)

Wolf Paul Barth (20 October 1942, in Wernigerode – 30 December 2016, in Nuremberg) was a German mathematician who discovered Barth surfaces and whose work on vector bundles has been important for the ADHM construction. Until 2011, Barth was working in the Department of Mathematics at the University of Erlangen-Nuremberg in Germany.

Barth received a PhD degree in 1967 from the University of Göttingen. His dissertation, written under the direction of Reinhold Remmert and Hans Grauert, was entitled Einige Eigenschaften analytischer Mengen in kompakten komplexen Mannigfaltigkeiten (Some properties of analytic sets in compact, complex manifolds).

== Publications ==
- Barth, Wolf (1977). "Moduli of vector bundles on the projective plane". Inventiones Mathematicae. 42 (1): 63–91. Bibcode:1977InMat..42...63B. doi:10.1007/bf01389784. MR 0460330. S2CID 121360092.
- Barth, Wolf (1977). "Some properties of stable rank-2 vector bundles on P_{n}". Mathematische Annalen. 226 (2): 125–150. doi:10.1007/bf01360864. MR 0429896. S2CID 121286408.
- Barth, Wolf (1996). "Two projective surfaces with many nodes, admitting the symmetries of the icosahedron". Journal of Algebraic Geometry. 5 (1): 173–186. MR 1358040.

== See also ==
- Barth surfaces
- Barth–Nieto quintic
