= Inoue–Hirzebruch surface =

In mathematics, a Inoue–Hirzebruch surface is a complex surface with no meromorphic functions introduced by Inoue (1977). They have Kodaira dimension κ = −∞, and are non-algebraic surfaces of class VII with positive second Betti number. Sankaran (1987) studied some higher-dimensional analogues.

== See also ==
- List of algebraic surfaces
