= Surface of class VII =

Part of the Kodaira classification

In mathematics, surfaces of class VII are non-algebraic complex surfaces studied by (Kodaira 1964, 1968) that have Kodaira dimension −∞ and first Betti number 1. Minimal surfaces of class VII (those with no rational curves with self-intersection −1) are called surfaces of class VII_{0}. Every class VII surface is birational to a unique minimal class VII surface, and can be obtained from this minimal surface by blowing up points a finite number of times.

The name "class VII" comes from (Kodaira 1964, theorem 21), which divided minimal surfaces into 7 classes numbered I_{0} to VII_{0}. However Kodaira's class VII_{0} did not have the condition that the Kodaira dimension is −∞, but instead had the condition that the geometric genus is 0. As a result, his class VII_{0} also included some other surfaces, such as secondary Kodaira surfaces, that are no longer considered to be class VII as they do not have Kodaira dimension −∞. The minimal surfaces of class VII are the class numbered "7" on the list of surfaces in (Kodaira 1968, theorem 55).

== Invariants ==
The irregularity q is 1, and h^{1,0} = 0. All plurigenera are 0.

Hodge diamond:

| | | 1 |
| | 0 | | 1 |
| 0 | | b_{2} | | 0 |
| | 1 | | 0 |
| | | 1 |

== Examples ==
Hopf surfaces are quotients of C^{2}−(0,0) by a discrete group G acting freely, and have vanishing second Betti numbers. The simplest example is to take G to be the integers, acting as multiplication by powers of 2; the corresponding Hopf surface is diffeomorphic to S^{1}×S^{3}.

Inoue surfaces are certain class VII surfaces whose universal cover is C×H where H is the upper half plane (so they are quotients of this by a group of automorphisms). They have vanishing second Betti numbers.

Inoue–Hirzebruch surfaces, Enoki surfaces, and Kato surfaces give examples of type VII surfaces with b_{2} > 0.

== Classification and global spherical shells ==
The minimal class VII surfaces with second Betti number b_{2}=0 have been classified by Bogomolov (1976, 1982), and are either Hopf surfaces or Inoue surfaces. Those with b_{2}=1 were classified by Nakamura (1984b) under an additional assumption that the surface has a curve, that was later proved by Teleman (2005).

A global spherical shell (Kato 1978) is a smooth 3-sphere in the surface with connected complement, with a neighbourhood biholomorphic to a neighbourhood of a sphere in C^{2}. The global spherical shell conjecture claims that all class VII_{0} surfaces with positive second Betti number have a global spherical shell. The manifolds with a global spherical shell are all Kato surfaces which are reasonably well understood, so a proof of this conjecture would lead to a classification of the type VII surfaces.

A class VII surface with positive second Betti number b_{2} has at most b_{2} rational curves, and has exactly this number if it has a global spherical shell. Conversely Georges Dloussky, Karl Oeljeklaus, and Matei Toma (2003) showed that if a minimal class VII surface with positive second Betti number b_{2} has exactly b_{2} rational curves then it has a global spherical shell.

For type VII surfaces with vanishing second Betti number, the primary Hopf surfaces have a global spherical shell, but secondary Hopf surfaces and Inoue surfaces do not because their fundamental groups are not infinite cyclic. Blowing up points on the latter surfaces gives non-minimal class VII surfaces with positive second Betti number that do not have spherical shells.
