= Fake projective plane =

In mathematics, a fake projective plane (or Mumford surface) is one of the 50 complex algebraic surfaces that have the same Betti numbers as the projective plane, but are not homeomorphic to it. Such objects are always algebraic surfaces of general type.

== History ==
Severi asked if there was a complex surface homeomorphic to the projective plane but not biholomorphic to it. Yau (1977) showed that there was no such surface, so the closest approximation to the projective plane one can have would be a surface with the same Betti numbers {{{1}}} as the projective plane. The first example was found by Mumford (1979) using p-adic uniformization introduced independently by Kurihara and Mustafin. Mumford also observed that Yau's result together with Weil's theorem on the rigidity of discrete cocompact subgroups of PU(1,2) implies that there are only a finite number of fake projective planes. Ishida & Kato (1998) found two more examples, using similar methods, and Keum (2006) found an example with an automorphism of order 7 that is birational to a cyclic cover of degree 7 of a Dolgachev surface. Prasad & Yeung (2007), Prasad & Yeung (2010) found a systematic way of classifying all fake projective planes, by showing that there are twenty-eight classes, each of which contains at least an example of fake projective plane up to isometry, and that there can at most be five more classes which were later shown not to exist. The problem of listing all fake projective planes is reduced to listing all subgroups of appropriate index of an explicitly given lattice associated to each class. By extending these calculations Cartwright & Steger (2010) showed that the twenty-eight classes exhaust all possibilities for fake projective planes and that there are altogether 50 examples determined up to isometry, or 100 fake projective planes up to biholomorphism.

A surface of general type with the same Betti numbers as a minimal surface not of general type must have the Betti numbers of either a projective plane P^{2} or a quadric P^{1}×P^{1}. Shavel (1978) constructed some "fake quadrics": surfaces of general type with the same Betti numbers as quadrics. Beauville surfaces give further examples.

Higher-dimensional analogues of fake projective surfaces are called fake projective spaces.

== The fundamental group ==
As a consequence of the work of Aubin and Yau on solution of Calabi Conjecture in the case of negative Ricci curvature, see Yau (1977, 1978), any fake projective plane is the quotient of a complex unit ball in 2 dimensions by a discrete subgroup, which is the fundamental group of the fake projective plane. This fundamental group must therefore be a torsion-free and cocompact discrete subgroup of PU(2,1) of Euler-Poincaré characteristic 3. Klingler (2003) and Yeung (2004) showed that this fundamental group must also be an arithmetic group. Mostow's strong rigidity results imply that the fundamental group determines the fake plane, in the strong sense that any compact surface with the same fundamental group must be isometric to it.

Two fake projective planes are defined to be in the same class if their fundamental groups are both contained in the same maximal arithmetic subgroup of automorphisms of the unit ball. Prasad & Yeung (2007), Prasad & Yeung (2010) used the volume formula for arithmetic groups from (Prasad 1989) to list 28 non-empty classes of fake projective planes and show that there can at most be five extra classes which are not expected to exist. (See the addendum of the paper where the classification was refined and some errors in the original paper was corrected.) Cartwright & Steger (2010) verified that the five extra classes indeed did not exist and listed all possibilities within the twenty-eight classes. There are exactly 50 fake projective planes classified up to isometry and hence 100 distinct fake projective planes classified up to biholomorphism.

The fundamental group of the fake projective plane is an arithmetic subgroup of PU(2,1). Write k for the associated number field (a totally real field) and G for the associated k-form of PU(2,1). If l is the quadratic extension of k over which G is an inner form, then l is a totally imaginary field. There is a division algebra D with center l and degree over l 3 or 1, with an involution of the second kind which restricts to the nontrivial automorphism of l over k, and a nontrivial Hermitian form on a module over D of dimension 1 or 3 such that G is the special unitary group of this Hermitian form. (As a consequence of Prasad & Yeung (2007) and the work of Cartwright and Steger, D has degree 3 over l and the module has dimension 1 over D.) There is one real place of k such that the points of G form a copy of PU(2,1), and over all other real places of k they form the compact group PU(3).

From the result of Prasad & Yeung (2007), the automorphism group of a fake projective plane is either cyclic of order 1, 3, or 7, or the non-cyclic group of order 9, or the non-abelian group of order 21. The quotients of the fake projective planes by these groups were studied by Keum (2008) and also by Cartwright & Steger (2010).

== List of the 50 fake projective planes ==
k	l	T	index	Fake projective planes
Q	Q(√−1)	5	3	3 fake planes in 3 classes
Q	Q(√−2)	3	3	3 fake planes in 3 classes
Q	Q(√−7)	2	21	7 fake planes in 2 classes. One of these classes contains the examples of Mumford and Keum.
Q	Q(√−7)	2, 3	3	4 fake planes in 2 classes
Q	Q(√−7)	2, 5	1	2 fake planes in 2 classes
Q	Q(√−15)	2	3	10 fake planes in 4 classes, including the examples founded by Ishida and Kato.
Q	Q(√−23)	2	1	2 fake planes in 2 classes
Q(√2)	Q(√−7+4√2)	2	3	2 fake planes in 2 classes
Q(√5)	Q(√5, ζ_{3})	2	9	7 fake planes in 2 classes
Q(√6)	Q(√6,ζ_{3})	2 or 2,3	1 or 3 or 9	5 fake planes in 3 classes
Q(√7)	Q(√7,ζ_{4})	2 or 3,3	21 or 3,3	5 fake planes in 3 classes

- k is a totally real field.
- l is a totally imaginary quadratic extension of k, and ζ_{3} is a cube root of 1.
- T is a set of primes of k where a certain local subgroup is not hyperspecial.
- index is the index of the fundamental group in a certain arithmetic group.
