= Fano surface =

Type of surface in algebraic geometry

In algebraic geometry, a Fano surface is a surface of general type (in particular, not a Fano variety) whose points index the lines on a non-singular cubic threefold. They were first studied by Fano (1904).

Hodge diamond:

		1
	5		5
10		25		10
	5		5
		1

Fano surfaces are perhaps the simplest and most studied examples of irregular surfaces of general type that are not related to a product of two curves and are not a complete intersection of divisors in an Abelian variety.

The Fano surface S of a smooth cubic threefold F into P^{4} carries many remarkable geometric properties. The surface S is naturally embedded into the grassmannian of lines G(2,5) of P^{4}. Let U be the restriction to S of the universal rank 2 bundle on G. We have the:

Tangent bundle Theorem (Fano, Clemens-Griffiths, Tyurin): The tangent bundle of S is isomorphic to U.

This is a quite interesting result because, a priori, there should be no link between these two bundles. It has many powerful applications. By example, one can recover the fact that the cotangent space of S is generated by global sections. This space of global 1-forms can be identified with the space of global sections of the tautological line bundle O(1) restricted to the cubic F and moreover:

Torelli-type Theorem : Let g' be the natural morphism from S to the grassmannian G(2,5) defined by the cotangent sheaf of S generated by its 5-dimensional space of global sections. Let F' be the union of the lines corresponding to g'(S). The threefold F' is isomorphic to F.

Thus knowing a Fano surface S, we can recover the threefold F. By the Tangent Bundle Theorem, we can also understand geometrically the invariants of S:

a) Recall that the second Chern number of a rank 2 vector bundle on a surface is the number of zeroes of a generic section. For a Fano surface S, a 1-form w defines also a hyperplane section {w=0} into P^{4} of the cubic F. The zeros of the generic w on S corresponds bijectively to the numbers of lines into the smooth cubic surface intersection of {w=0} and F, therefore we recover that the second Chern class of S equals 27.

b) Let w_{1}, w_{2} be two 1-forms on S. The canonical divisor K on S associated to the canonical form w_{1} ∧ w_{2} parametrizes the lines on F that cut the plane P={w_{1}=w_{2}=0} into P^{4}. Using w_{1} and w_{2} such that the intersection of P and F is the union of 3 lines, one can recover the fact that K^{2}=45. Let us give some details of that computation: By a generic point of the cubic F goes 6 lines. Let s be a point of S and let L_{s} be the corresponding line on the cubic F. Let C_{s} be the divisor on S parametrizing lines that cut the line L_{s}. The self-intersection of C_{s} is equal to the intersection number of C_{s} and C_{t} for t a generic point. The intersection of C_{s} and C_{t} is the set of lines on F that cuts the disjoint lines L_{s} and L_{t}. Consider the linear span of L_{s} and L_{t}: it is an hyperplane into P^{4} that cuts F into a smooth cubic surface. By well known results on a cubic surface, the number of lines that cuts two disjoints lines is 5, thus we get (C_{s}) ^{2} =C_{s} C_{t}=5. As K is numerically equivalent to 3C_{s}, we obtain K ^{2} =45.

c) The natural composite map: S → G(2,5) → P^{9} is the canonical map of S. It is an embedding.

== See also ==
- Hodge theory
