= Tetsuji Shioda =

Japanese mathematician

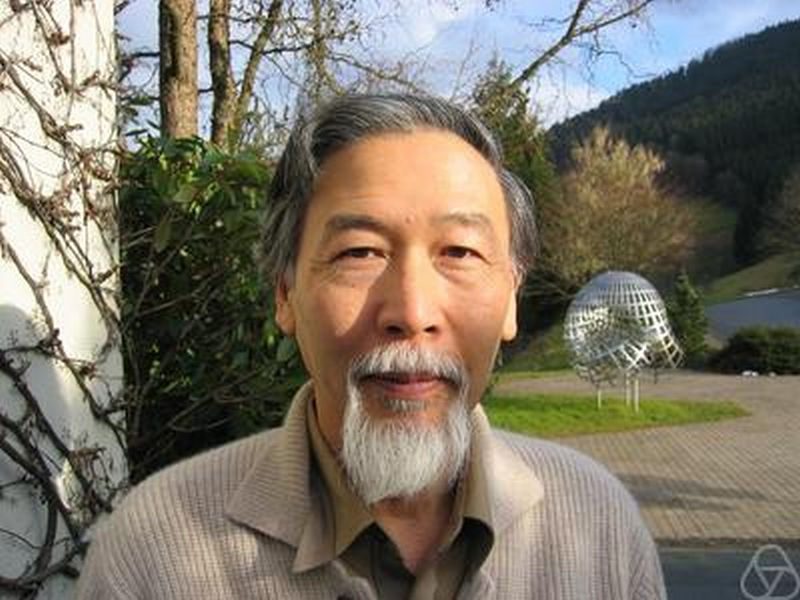
Tetsuji Shioda, Oberwolfach 2005

Tetsuji Shioda (塩田 徹治) was a Japanese mathematician who introduced Shioda modular surfaces and who used Mordell–Weil lattices to give examples of dense sphere packings. He was an invited speaker at the ICM in 1990.
