= Beauville surface =

In mathematics, a Beauville surface is one of the surfaces of general type introduced by Arnaud Beauville (1996, exercise X.13 (4)). They are examples of "fake quadrics", with the same Betti numbers as quadric surfaces.

== Construction ==
Let C_{1} and C_{2} be smooth curves with genera g_{1} and g_{2}. Let G be a finite group acting on C_{1} and C_{2} such that

- G has order (g_{1} − 1)(g_{2} − 1)
- No nontrivial element of G has a fixed point on both C_{1} and C_{2}
- C_{1}/G and C_{2}/G are both rational.

Then the quotient (C_{1} × C_{2})/G is a Beauville surface. The corresponding group G is called a Beauville group.

One example is to take C_{1} and C_{2} both copies of the genus 6 quintic X^{5} + Y^{5} + Z^{5} =0, and G to be an elementary abelian group of order 25, with suitable actions on the two curves.

== Invariants ==
Hodge diamond:

		1
	0		0
0		2		0
	0		0
		1
