= Enoki surface =

In mathematics, an Enoki surface is compact complex surface with positive second Betti number that has a global spherical shell and a non-trivial divisor D with H^{0}(O(D)) ≠ 0 and (D, D) = 0. Enoki (1980) constructed some examples. They are surfaces of class VII, so are non-Kähler and have Kodaira dimension −∞.
