= Todorov surface =

In algebraic geometry, a Todorov surface is one of a class of surfaces of general type introduced by Todorov (1981) for which the conclusion of the Torelli theorem does not hold.
