= Hirzebruch surface =

Ruled surface over the projective line

In mathematics, a Hirzebruch surface is a ruled surface over the projective line. They were studied by Friedrich Hirzebruch (1951).

== Definition ==
The Hirzebruch surface $\Sigma_n$ is the $\mathbb{P}^1$-bundle (a projective bundle) over the projective line $\mathbb{P}^1$, associated to the sheaf
$$\mathcal{O}\oplus \mathcal{O}(-n).$$
The notation here means: $\mathcal{O}(n)$ is the n-th tensor power of the Serre twist sheaf $\mathcal{O}(1)$, the invertible sheaf or line bundle with associated Cartier divisor a single point. The surface $\Sigma_0$ is isomorphic to $\mathbb P^1\times \mathbb P^1$; and $\Sigma_1$ is isomorphic to the projective plane $\mathbb P^2$ blown up at a point, so it is not minimal.

=== GIT quotient ===
One method for constructing the Hirzebruch surface is by using a GIT quotient:
$$\Sigma_n = (\Complex^2-\{0\})\times (\Complex^2-\{0\})/(\Complex^*\times\Complex^*)$$
where the action of $\Complex^*\times\Complex^*$ is given by
$$(\lambda, \mu)\cdot(l_0,l_1,t_0,t_1) = (\lambda l_0, \lambda l_1, \mu t_0,\lambda^{-n}\mu t_1)\ .$$
This action can be interpreted as the action of $\lambda$ on the first two factors comes from the action of $\Complex^*$ on $\Complex^2 - \{0\}$ defining $\mathbb{P}^1$, and the second action is a combination of the construction of a direct sum of line bundles on $\mathbb{P}^1$ and their projectivization. For the direct sum $\mathcal{O}\oplus \mathcal{O}(-n)$ this can be given by the quotient variety
$$\mathcal{O}\oplus \mathcal{O}(-n) = (\Complex^2-\{0\})\times \Complex^2/\Complex^*$$
where the action of $\Complex^*$ is given by
$$\lambda \cdot (l_0,l_1,t_0,t_1) = (\lambda l_0, \lambda l_1,\lambda^0 t_0=t_0, \lambda^{-n} t_1)$$
Then, the projectivization $\mathbb{P}(\mathcal{O}\oplus\mathcal{O}(-n))$ is given by another $\Complex^*$-action sending an equivalence class $[l_0,l_1,t_0,t_1] \in\mathcal{O}\oplus\mathcal{O}(-n)$ to
$$\mu \cdot [l_0,l_1,t_0,t_1] = [l_0,l_1,\mu t_0,\mu t_1]$$
Combining these two actions gives the original quotient up top.

=== Transition maps ===
One way to construct this $\mathbb{P}^1$-bundle is by using transition functions. Since affine vector bundles are necessarily trivial, over the charts $U_0,U_1$ of $\mathbb{P}^1$ defined by $x_i \neq 0$ there is the local model of the bundle
$$U_i\times \mathbb{P}^1$$
Then, the transition maps, induced from the transition maps of $\mathcal{O}\oplus \mathcal{O}(-n)$ give the map
$$U_0\times\mathbb{P}^1|_{U_1} \to U_1\times\mathbb{P}^1|_{U_0}$$
sending
$$(X_0, [y_0:y_1]) \mapsto (X_1, [y_0:x_0^n y_1])$$
where $X_i$ is the affine coordinate function on $U_i$.

== Properties ==
=== Projective rank 2 bundles over P^{1} ===
Note that by Grothendieck's theorem, for any rank 2 vector bundle $E$ on $\mathbb P^1$ there are numbers $a,b \in \mathbb Z$ such that
$$E \cong \mathcal{O}(a)\oplus \mathcal{O}(b).$$
As taking the projective bundle is invariant under tensoring by a line bundle, the ruled surface associated to $E = \mathcal O(a) \oplus \mathcal O(b)$ is the Hirzebruch surface $\Sigma_{b-a}$ since this bundle can be tensored by $\mathcal{O}(-a)$.

==== Isomorphisms of Hirzebruch surfaces ====
In particular, the above observation gives an isomorphism between $\Sigma_n$ and $\Sigma_{-n}$ since there is the isomorphism vector bundles
$$\mathcal{O}(n)\otimes(\mathcal{O} \oplus \mathcal{O}(-n)) \cong \mathcal{O}(n) \oplus \mathcal{O}$$

=== Analysis of associated symmetric algebra ===
Recall that projective bundles can be constructed using Relative Proj, which is formed from the graded sheaf of algebras
$$\bigoplus_{i=0}^\infty \operatorname{Sym}^i(\mathcal{O}\oplus \mathcal{O}(-n))$$
The first few symmetric modules are special since there is a non-trivial anti-symmetric $\operatorname{Alt}^2$-module $\mathcal{O}\otimes \mathcal{O}(-n)$. These sheaves are summarized in the table
$$\begin{align}
\operatorname{Sym}^0(\mathcal{O}\oplus \mathcal{O}(-n)) &= \mathcal{O} \\
\operatorname{Sym}^1(\mathcal{O}\oplus \mathcal{O}(-n)) &= \mathcal{O} \oplus \mathcal{O}(-n) \\
\operatorname{Sym}^2(\mathcal{O}\oplus \mathcal{O}(-n)) &= \mathcal{O} \oplus \mathcal{O}(-2n)
\end{align}$$
For $i > 2$ the symmetric sheaves are given by
$$\begin{align}
\operatorname{Sym}^k(\mathcal{O}\oplus \mathcal{O}(-n)) &=
\bigoplus_{i=0}^k \mathcal{O}^{\otimes (n-i)}\otimes \mathcal{O}(-in)
\\
&\cong \mathcal{O}\oplus \mathcal{O}(-n) \oplus \cdots \oplus \mathcal{O}(-kn)
\end{align}$$

=== Intersection theory ===
Hirzebruch surfaces for n > 0 have a special rational curve C on them: The surface is the projective bundle of $\mathcal{O}(-n)$ and the curve C is the zero section. This curve has self-intersection number −n, and is the only irreducible curve with negative self intersection number. The only irreducible curves with zero self intersection number are the fibers of the Hirzebruch surface (considered as a fiber bundle over $\mathbb P^1$). The Picard group is generated by the curve C and one of the fibers, and these generators have intersection matrix
$$\begin{bmatrix}0 & 1 \\ 1 & -n \end{bmatrix} ,$$
so the bilinear form is two dimensional unimodular, and is even or odd depending on whether n is even or odd. The Hirzebruch surface Σ_{n} (n > 1) blown up at a point on the special curve C is isomorphic to Σ_{n+1} blown up at a point not on the special curve.

=== Toric variety ===
The Hirzebruch surface $\Sigma_n$ can be given an action of the complex torus $T = \mathbb{C}^*\times \mathbb{C}^*$, with one $\mathbb{C}^*$ acting on the base $\mathbb{P}^1$ with two fixed axis points, and the other $\mathbb{C}^*$ acting on the fibers of the vector bundle $\mathcal{O}\oplus \mathcal{O}(-n)$, specifically on the first line bundle component, and hence on the projective bundle. This produces an open orbit of T, making $\Sigma_n$ a toric variety. Its associated fan partitions the standard lattice $\mathbb{Z}^2$ into four cones (each corresponding to a coordinate chart), separated by the rays along the four vectors:

$(1,0), (0,1), (0,-1), (-1,n).$

All the theory above generalizes to arbitrary toric varieties, including the construction of the variety as a quotient and by coordinate charts, as well as the explicit intersection theory.

Any smooth toric surface except $\mathbb{P}^2$ can be constructed by repeatedly blowing up a Hirzebruch surface at T-fixed points.

== See also ==
- Projective bundle
