= Klein cubic threefold =

In algebraic geometry, the Klein cubic threefold is the non-singular cubic threefold in 4-dimensional projective space given by the equation

$$V^2W+W^2X+X^2Y+Y^2Z+Z^2V =0 \,$$

studied by Klein (1879). Its automorphism group is the group PSL_{2}(11) of order 660 (Adler 1978). It is unirational but not a rational variety. Gross & Popescu (2001) showed that it is birational to the moduli space of (1,11)-polarized abelian surfaces.
