= Bordiga surface =

Isometric rational surface of degree 6 in P4

In algebraic geometry, a Bordiga surface is a certain sort of rational surface of degree 6 in P^{4}, introduced by Giovanni Bordiga.

A Bordiga surface is isomorphic to the projective plane blown up in 10 points, the embedding into P^{4} is given by the 5-dimensional space of quartics passing through the 10 points. White surfaces are the generalizations using more points.
