= Burniat surface =

Surface of general type, in mathematics

In mathematics, a Burniat surface is one of the surfaces of general type introduced by Pol Burniat (1966).

== Invariants ==
The geometric genus and irregularity are both equal to 0. The Chern number $c_1^2$ is either 2, 3, 4, 5, or 6.
