= Nodal surface =

In algebraic geometry, a nodal surface is a surface in a (usually complex) projective space whose only singularities are nodes. A major problem about them is to find the maximum number of nodes of a nodal surface of given degree.

The following table gives some known upper and lower bounds for the maximal number of nodes on a complex surface of given degree. In degree 7, 9, 11, and 13, the upper bound is given by Varchenko (1983), which is better than the one by Miyaoka (1984).

Degree	Lower bound	Surface achieving lower bound	Upper bound
1	0	Plane	0
2	1	Conical surface	1
3	4	Cayley's nodal cubic surface	4
4	16	Kummer surface	16
5	31	Togliatti surface	31 (Beauville)
6	65	Barth sextic	65 (Jaffe and Ruberman)
7	99	Labs septic	104
8	168	Endraß surface	174
9	226	Labs	246
10	345	Barth decic	360
11	425	Chmutov	480
12	600	Sarti surface	645
13	732	Chmutov	829
d			$\tfrac49 d (d-1)^2$ (Miyaoka 1984)
d ≡ 0 (mod 3)	$\tbinom d2 \lfloor \tfrac d2 \rfloor + (\tfrac{d^2}3 - d + 1)\lfloor\tfrac{d-1}2\rfloor$	Escudero	
d ≡ ±1 (mod 6)	$(5d^3 - 14d^2 + 13d - 4)/12$	Chmutov	
d ≡ ±2 (mod 6)	$(5d^3 - 13d^2 + 16d - 8)/12$	Chmutov	

== See also ==
- Algebraic surface
