= Campedelli surface =

In mathematics, a Campedelli surface is one of the surfaces of general type introduced by Campedelli. Surfaces with the same Hodge numbers are called numerical Campedelli surfaces.

== Invariants ==
Hodge diamond:

		1
	0		0
0		8		0
	0		0
		1
