= Hopf surface =

In complex geometry, a Hopf surface is a compact complex surface obtained as a quotient of the complex vector space (with zero deleted) $\Complex^2\setminus \{0\}$ by a free action of a discrete group. If this group is the integers the Hopf surface is called primary, otherwise it is called secondary. (Some authors use the term "Hopf surface" to mean "primary Hopf surface".) The first example was found by Heinz Hopf (1948), with the discrete group isomorphic to the integers, with a generator acting on $\Complex^2$ by multiplication by 2; this was the first example of a compact complex surface with no Kähler metric.

Higher-dimensional analogues of Hopf surfaces are called Hopf manifolds.

== Invariants ==
Hopf surfaces are surfaces of class VII and in particular all have Kodaira dimension $-\infty$, and all their plurigenera vanish. The geometric genus is 0. The fundamental group has a normal central infinite cyclic subgroup of finite index. The Hodge diamond is

		1
	0		1
0		0		0
	1		0
		1

In particular the first Betti number is 1 and the second Betti number is 0. Conversely Kunihiko Kodaira (1968) showed that a compact complex surface with vanishing the second Betti number and whose fundamental group contains an infinite cyclic subgroup of finite index is a Hopf surface.

== Primary Hopf surfaces ==
In the course of classification of compact complex surfaces, Kodaira classified the primary Hopf surfaces.

A primary Hopf surface is obtained as

$$H=\Big(\Complex^2\setminus \{0\}\Big)/\Gamma,$$

where $\Gamma$ is a group generated by a polynomial contraction $\gamma$. Kodaira has found a normal form for $\gamma$. In appropriate coordinates, $\gamma$ can be written as

$$(x, y) \mapsto (\alpha x +\lambda y^n, \beta y)$$

where $\alpha, \beta\in \Complex$ are complex numbers satisfying $0<|\alpha|\leq |\beta| <1$, and either $\lambda=0$ or $\alpha=\beta^n$.

These surfaces contain an elliptic curve (the image of the x-axis) and if $\lambda=0$ the image of the y-axis is a second elliptic curve. When $\lambda=0$, the Hopf surface is an elliptic fiber space over the projective line if $\alpha^m =\beta^n$ for some positive integers m and n, with the map to the projective line given by $(x, y) \mapsto x^m y^{-n}$, and otherwise the only curves are the two images of the axes.

The Picard group of any primary Hopf surface is isomorphic to the non-zero complex numbers $\Complex^*$.

Kodaira (1966b) has proven that a complex surface is diffeomorphic to $S^3\times S^1$ if and only if it is a primary Hopf surface.

== Secondary Hopf surfaces ==
Any secondary Hopf surface has a finite unramified cover that is a primary Hopf surface. Equivalently, its fundamental group has a subgroup of finite index in its center that is isomorphic to the integers. Masahido Kato (1975) classified them by finding the finite groups acting without fixed points on primary Hopf surfaces.

Many examples of secondary Hopf surfaces can be constructed with underlying space a product of a spherical space forms and a circle.
