= Barlow surface =

In mathematics, a Barlow surface is one of the complex surfaces discovered by Rebecca Barlow (1984, 1985). They are simply connected surfaces of general type with p_{g} = 0. They are homeomorphic but not diffeomorphic to a projective plane blown up in 8 points. The Hodge diamond for the Barlow surfaces is:

		1
	0		0
0		9		0
	0		0
		1

== Detection of exotic smooth structures ==
According to Freedman's classification, a simply connected oriented closed topological 4-manifold with intersection form $[+1]\oplus 8[-1]$ is homeomorphic to $\mathbb{C}P^2\# 8\overline{\mathbb{C}P^2}$. Any such smooth manifold with a non-vanishing Seiberg–Witten invariant has an exotic smooth structure since $\mathbb{C}P^2\# 8\overline{\mathbb{C}P^2}$ with the induced smooth structure allows a Riemannian metric of positive scalar curvature (psc metric) and therefore has only vanishing Seiberg–Witten invariants.

== See also ==
- Hodge theory
