= Shioda modular surface =

In mathematics, a Shioda modular surface is one of the elliptic surfaces studied by Shioda (1972).
