= Sarti surface =

Algebraic surface of degree 12

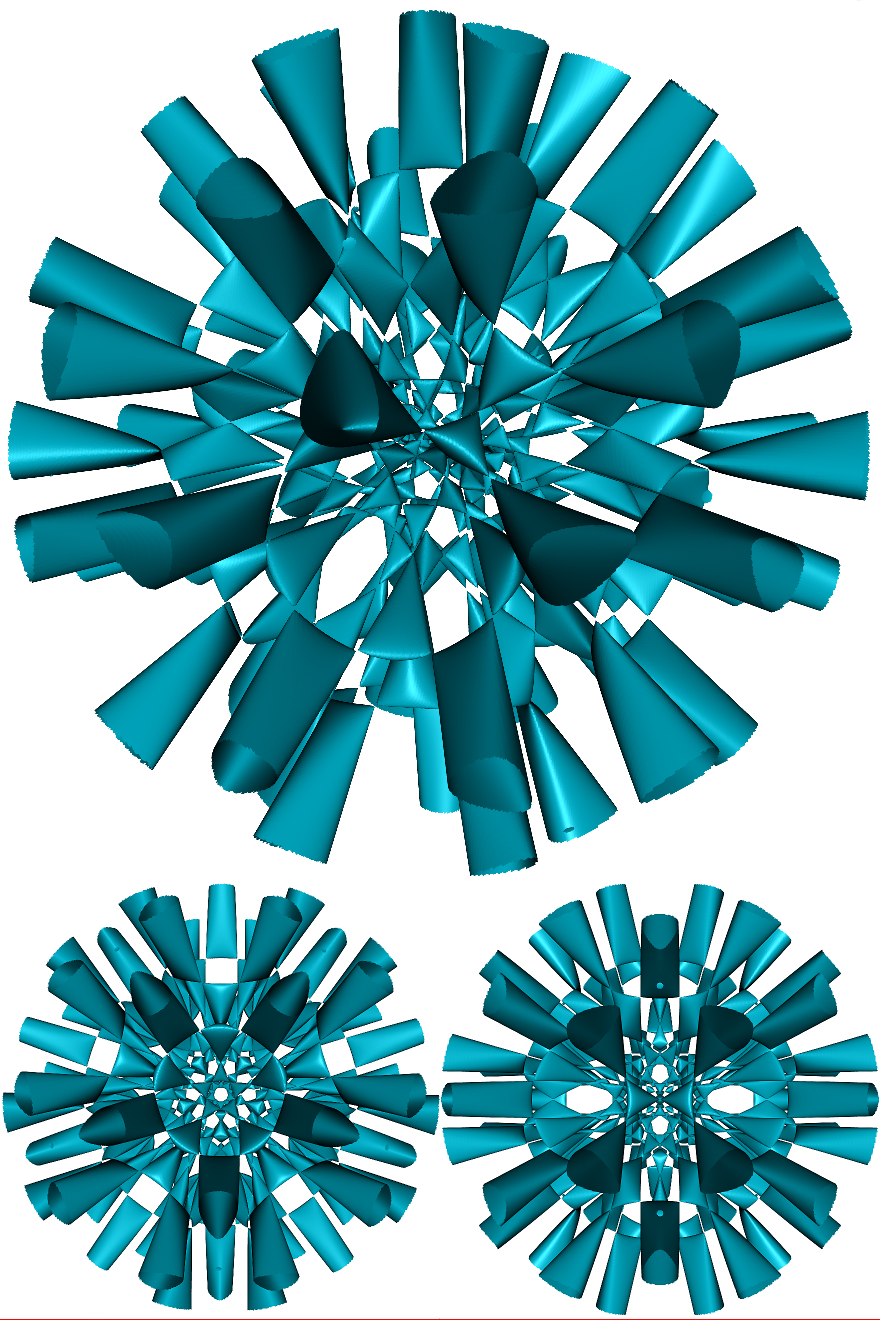

In algebraic geometry, a Sarti surface is a degree-12 nodal surface with 600 nodes, found by Alessandra Sarti in 1999 and published by her in 2001. The maximal possible number of nodes of a degree-12 surface is not known (as of 2015), though Yoichi Miyaoka showed that it is at most 645.

Sarti has also found sextic, octic and dodectic nodal surfaces with high numbers of nodes and high degrees of symmetry.

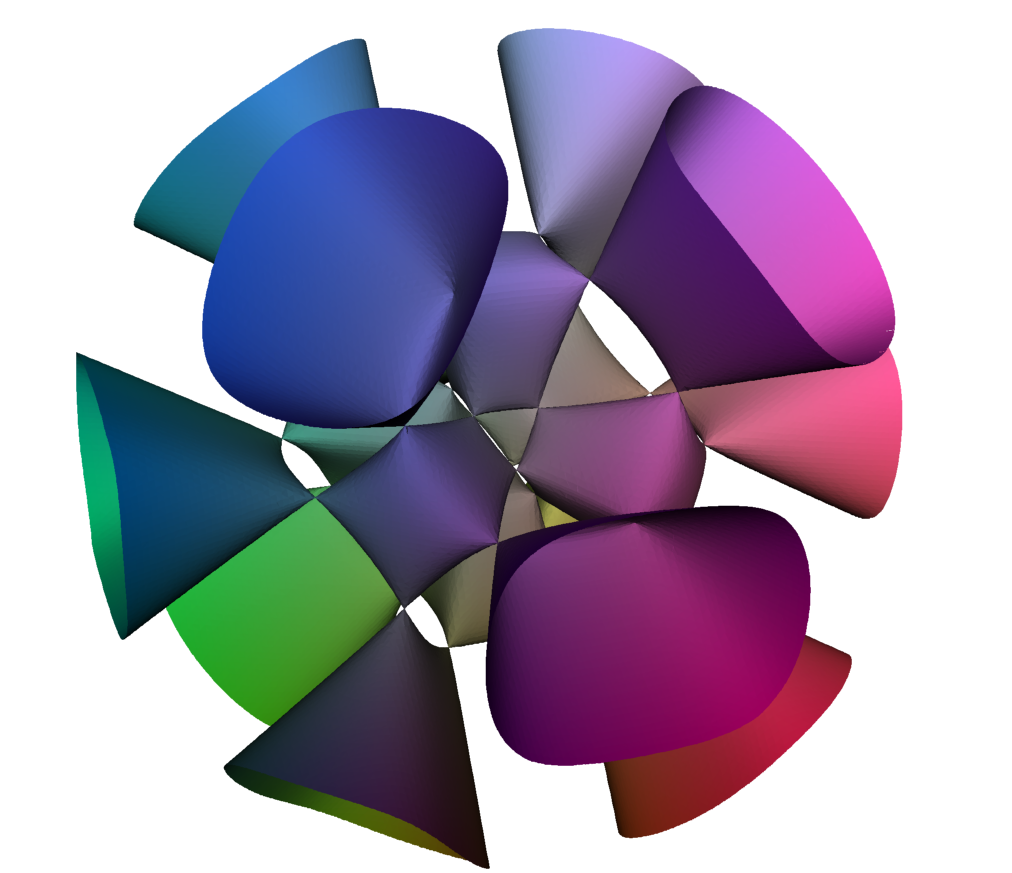
Sextic with 48 node

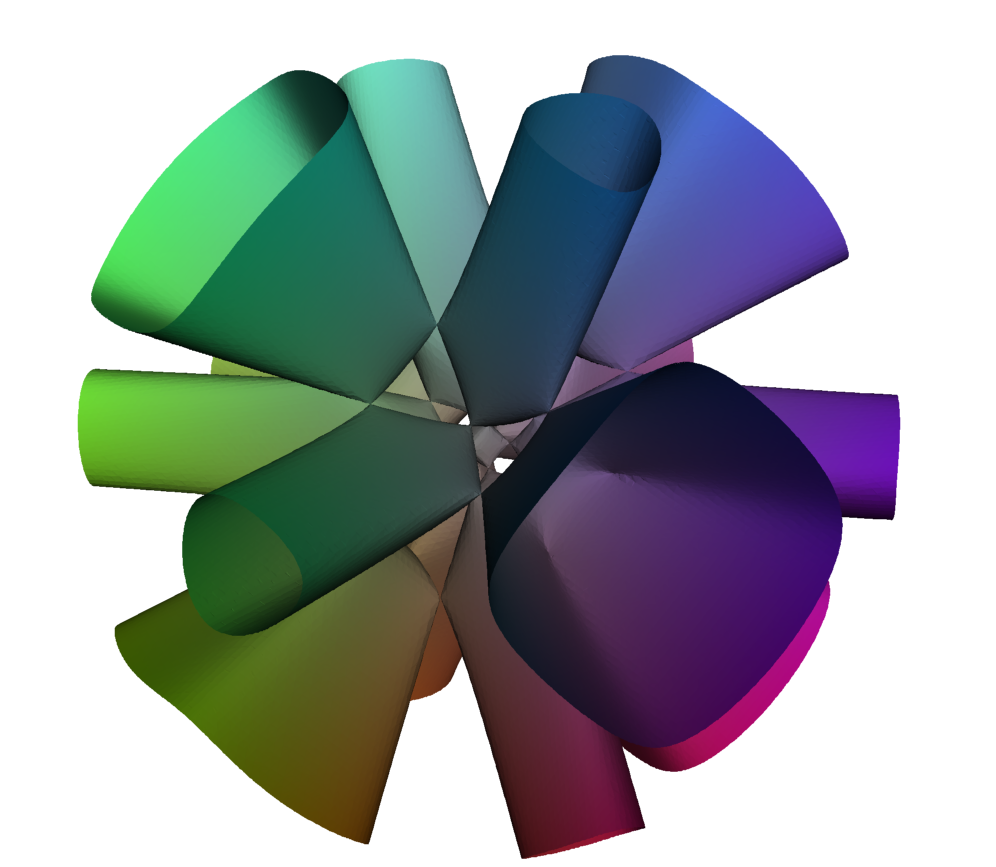
Sextic with 48 node

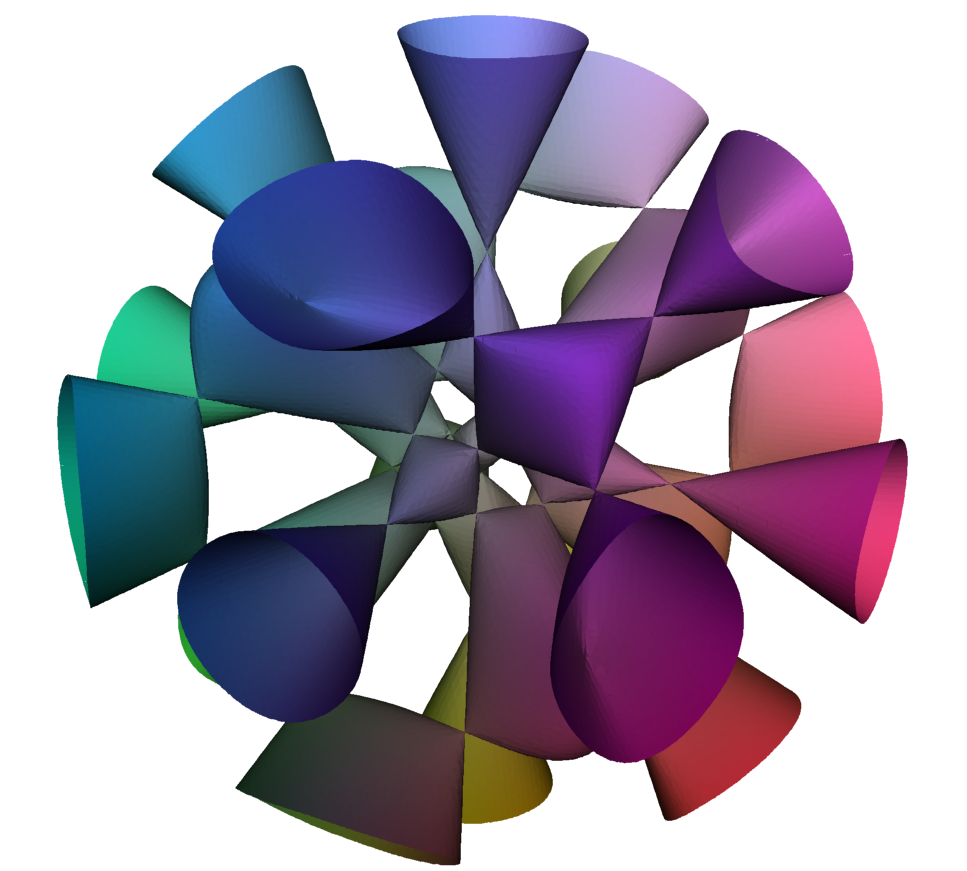
Octic with 72 nodes

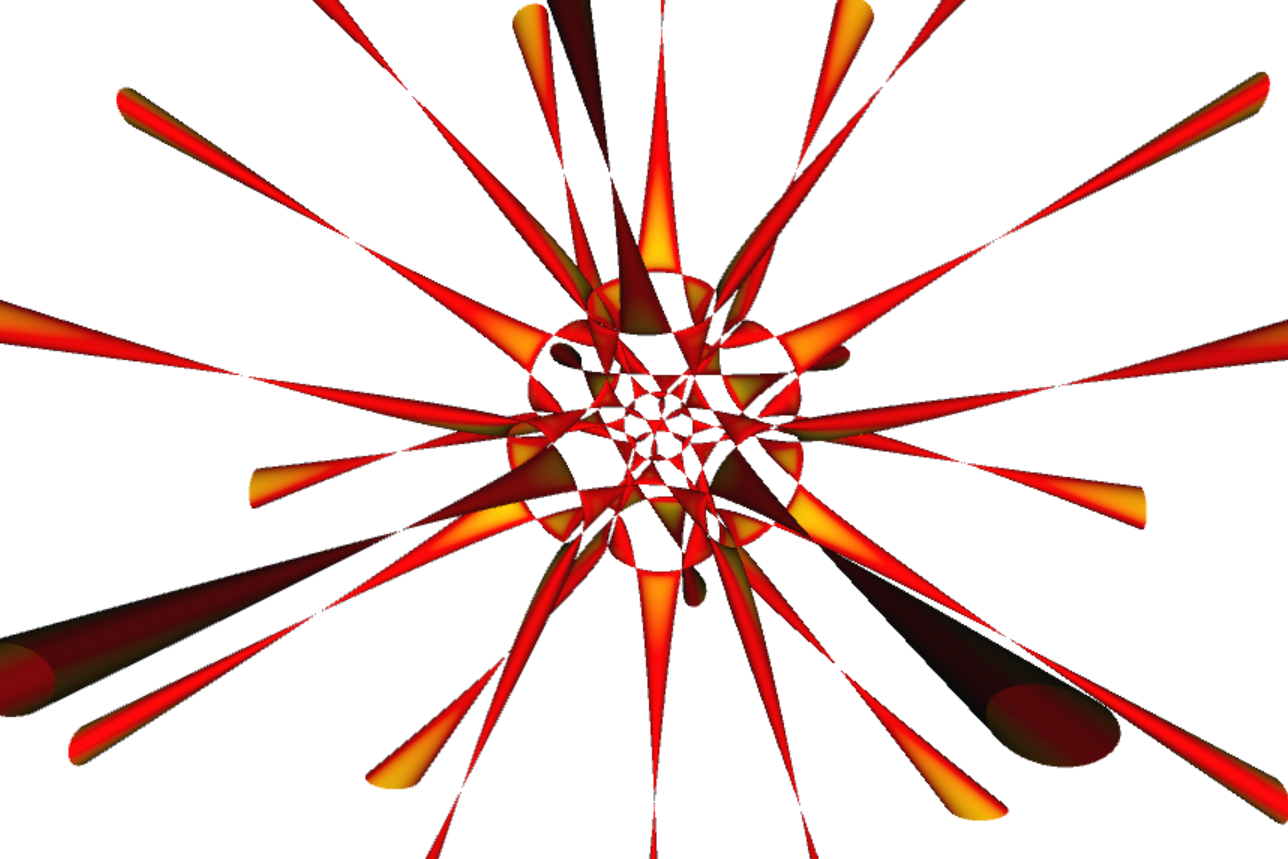
Octic with 144 nodes

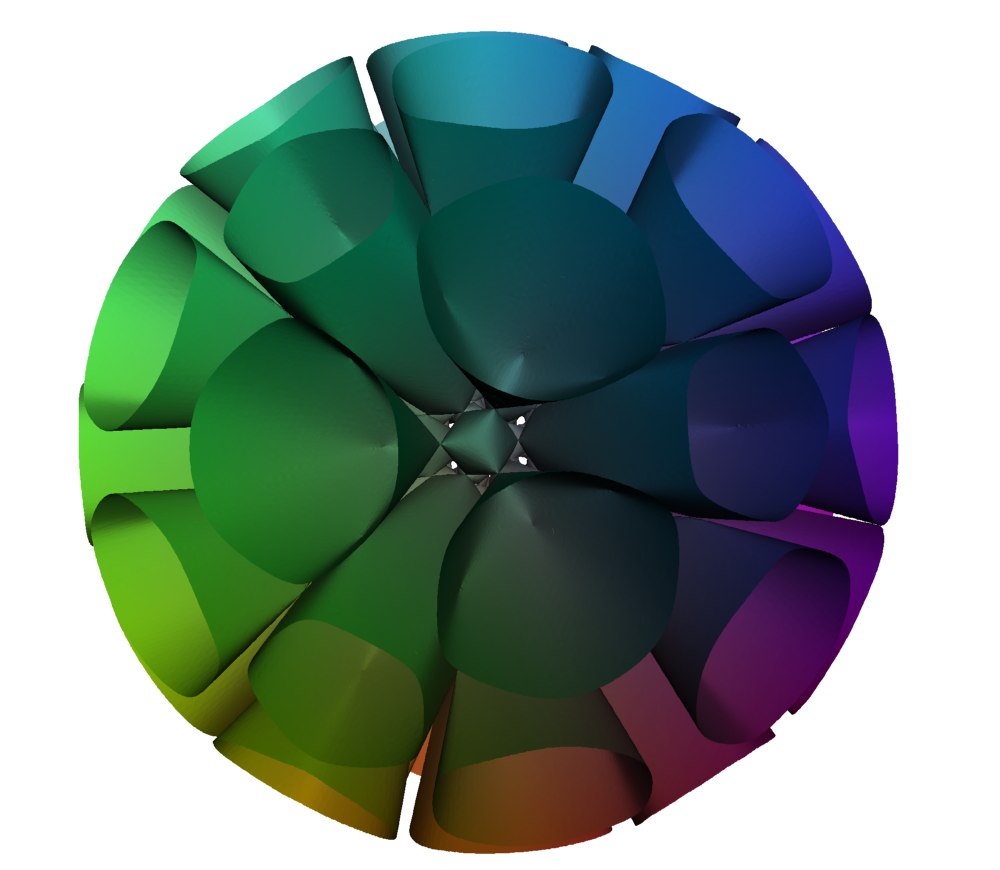
Dodectic surface with 360 nodes

3D model of Sarti surface

== See also ==
- Nodal surface
