= Fermat cubic =

Geometrical surface

3D model of Fermat cubic (real points)

In geometry, the Fermat cubic, named after Pierre de Fermat, is a surface defined by

$$x^3 + y^3 + z^3 = 1. \$$

Methods of algebraic geometry provide the following parameterization of Fermat's cubic:

$$x(s,t) = {3 t - {1\over 3} (s^2 + s t + t^2)^2 \over t (s^2 + s t + t^2) - 3}$$

$$y(s,t) = {3 s + 3 t + {1\over 3} (s^2 + s t + t^2)^2 \over t (s^2 + s t + t^2) - 3}$$

$$z(s,t) = {-3 - (s^2 + s t + t^2) (s + t) \over t (s^2 + s t + t^2) - 3}.$$

In projective space the Fermat cubic is given by

$$w^3+x^3+y^3+z^3=0.$$

The 27 lines lying on the Fermat cubic are easy to describe explicitly: they are the 9 lines of the form (w : aw : y : by) where a and b are fixed numbers with cube −1, and their 18 conjugates under permutations of coordinates.

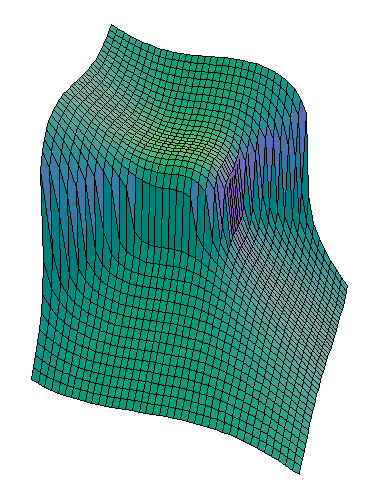

Real points of Fermat cubic surface.
