= Vanishing theorem =

In algebraic geometry, a vanishing theorem gives conditions for coherent cohomology groups to vanish.

- Andreotti–Grauert vanishing theorem
- Bogomolov–Sommese vanishing theorem
- Grauert–Riemenschneider vanishing theorem
- Kawamata–Viehweg vanishing theorem
- Kodaira vanishing theorem
- Le Potier's vanishing theorem
- Mumford vanishing theorem
- Nakano vanishing theorem
- Ramanujam vanishing theorem
- Serre's vanishing theorem
- Nadel vanishing theorem
