= Nadel vanishing theorem =

Vanishing theorem for multiplier ideals

In mathematics, the Nadel vanishing theorem is a global vanishing theorem for multiplier ideals, introduced by A. M. Nadel in 1989. It generalizes the Kodaira vanishing theorem using singular metrics with (strictly) positive curvature, and also it can be seen as an analytical analogue of the Kawamata–Viehweg vanishing theorem.

== Statement ==
The theorem can be stated as follows. Let X be a smooth complex projective variety, D an effective $\mathbb{Q}$-divisor and L a line bundle on X, and $\mathcal{J}(D)$ is a multiplier ideal sheaves. Assume that $L - D$ is big and nef. Then

$H^{i} \left(X, \mathcal{O}_{X}(K_X + L) \otimes \mathcal{J}(D) \right) = 0 \;\; \text{for} \;\; i > 0.$

Nadel vanishing theorem in the analytic setting: Let $(X, \omega)$ be a Kähler manifold (X be a reduced complex space (complex analytic variety) with a Kähler metric) such that weakly pseudoconvex, and let F be a holomorphic line bundle over X equipped with a singular hermitian metric of weight $\varphi$. Assume that $\sqrt{-1} \cdot \theta(F) > \varepsilon \cdot \omega$ for some continuous positive function $\varepsilon$ on X. Then

$H^{i} \left(X, \mathcal{O}_{X}(K_X + F) \otimes \mathcal{J}(\varphi) \right) = 0 \;\; \text{for} \;\; i > 0.$

Let arbitrary plurisubharmonic function $\phi$ on $\Omega \subset X$, then a multiplier ideal sheaf $\mathcal{J}(\phi)$ is a coherent on $\Omega$, and therefore its zero variety is an analytic set.
