= Bonnet theorem =

Rigidity theorem in differential geometry

In the mathematical field of differential geometry, the fundamental theorem of surface theory deals with the problem of prescribing the geometric data of a submanifold of Euclidean space. Originally proved by Pierre Ossian Bonnet in 1867, it has since been extended to higher dimensions and non-Euclidean contexts.

== Bonnet's theorem ==
Any surface in three-dimensional Euclidean space has a first and second fundamental form, which automatically are interrelated by the Gauss–Codazzi equations. Bonnet's theorem asserts a local converse to this result.

Given an open region D in R^{2}, let g and h be symmetric 2-tensors on D, with g additionally required to be positive-definite. If these are smooth and satisfy the Gauss–Codazzi equations, then Bonnet's theorem says that D is covered by open sets which can be smoothly embedded into R^{3} with first fundamental form g and second fundamental form (relative to one of the two choices of unit normal vector field) h. Furthermore, each of these embeddings is uniquely determined up to a rigid motion of R^{3}.

Bonnet's theorem is a corollary of the Frobenius theorem, upon viewing the Gauss–Codazzi equations as a system of first-order partial differential equations for the two coordinate derivatives of the position vector of an embedding, together with the normal vector.

== Related results ==
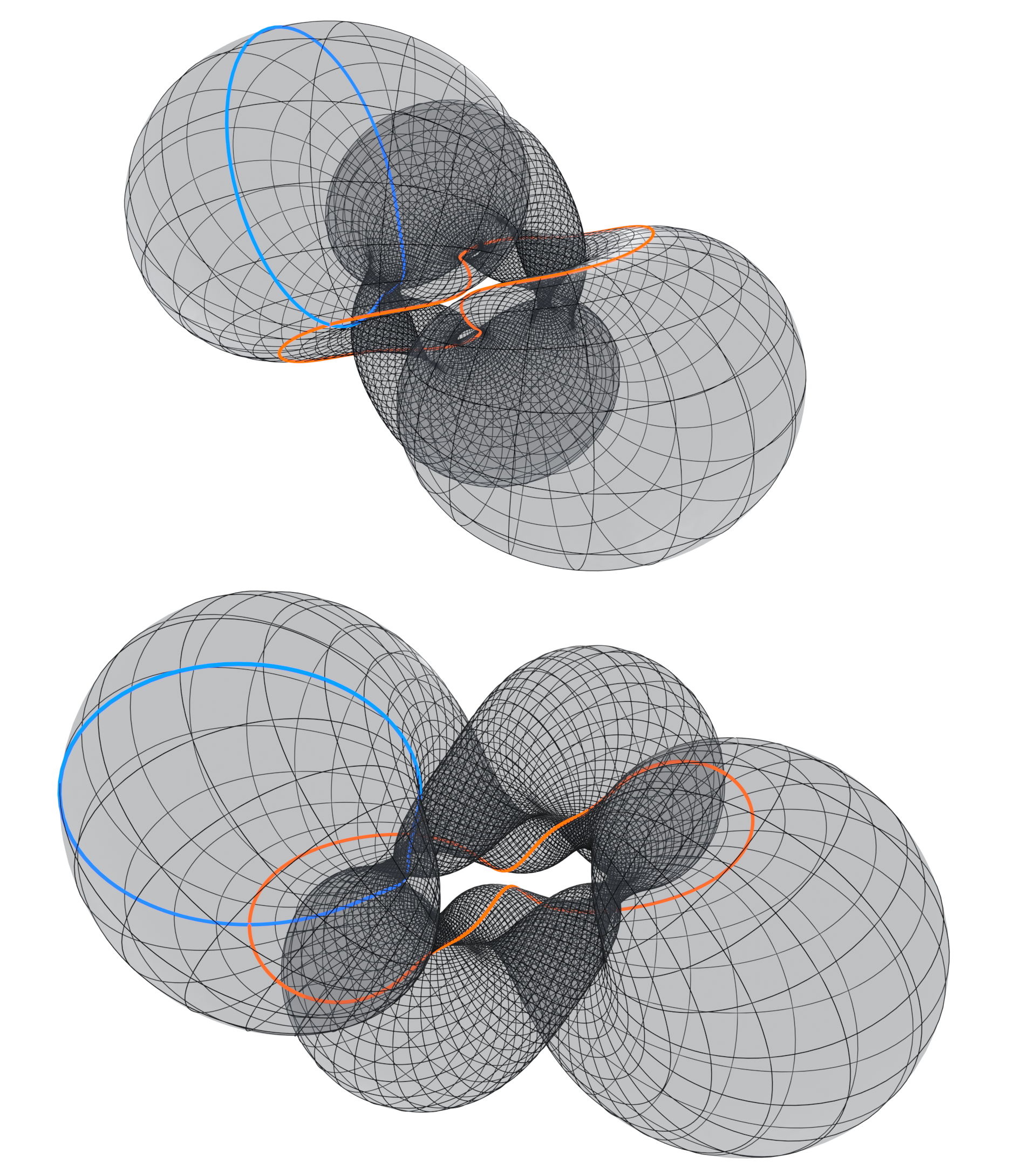
A compact Bonnet pair: two non-congruent immersed real analytic tori that are related by a mean curvature preserving isometry.

H. Blaine Lawson and Renato de Azevedo Tribuzy showed that for a compact surface, prescribing the first fundamental form (the induced metric) together with a nonconstant mean curvature function on the surface (the average of the principal curvatures, equivalently half the trace of the shape operator) yields at most two compact smooth immersions in R^{3} up to congruence, and at most one for genus-zero surfaces. When two noncongruent immersions realize the same first fundamental form and the same mean curvature function, they form a compact Bonnet pair. In 2025, Bobenko, Hoffmann, and Sageman-Furnas constructed the first explicit compact Bonnet pairs, consisting of two immersed tori in R^{3}.

== General formulations ==
Bonnet's theorem can be naturally formulated for hypersurfaces in a Euclidean space of any dimension, and the result remains true in this context. Furthermore, the theorem can be extended from Bonnet's local formulation to a global formulation, allowing D to be any connected and simply-connected smooth manifold, with the result asserting the existence and uniqueness (up to a rigid motion) of a smooth immersion of D as a hypersurface of Euclidean space with first fundamental form g and second fundamental form h. The idea of the proof is to use the existence theory from the local formulation to construct the immersion along arbitrary curves emanating from a single point. Simple-connectedness is used to say that any two such curves with a common endpoint are homotopic (through paths fixing the endpoints), and uniqueness from the local formulation implies that the value of the immersion at the endpoint must be fixed through the homotopy, so that an immersion results which is well-defined on the entire manifold.

In this global formulation, existence would not hold in general if the condition of simple-connectedness were removed. This can be seen from the nonexistence of a hypersurface immersion of the torus whose first fundamental form is flat and whose second fundamental form is zero.

The theorem can also be extended, beyond the context of hypersurfaces, to the theory of submanifolds of arbitrary codimension. This is more complicated to formulate, because in addition to the first and second fundamental forms, there is also the (generally nontrivial) connection in the normal bundle which must be taken into account. In this generality, the fundamental theorem of surface theory subsumes the fundamental theorem of curves.

In this general context, the ambient Euclidean space can also be replaced by any connected and geodesically complete Riemannian manifold of constant curvature, which (as with the more special case of higher codimension) requires a suitably extended formulation of the Gauss–Codazzi equations.

== Bibliography ==
- Bobenko, Alexander I.; Hoffmann, Tim; Sageman-Furnas, Andrew O. (2025). "Compact Bonnet pairs: isometric tori with the same curvatures". Publications mathématiques de l'IHÉS. 142 (1): 241–293. arXiv:2110.06335. doi:10.1007/s10240-025-00159-z.
- Bonnet, O. (1867). "Mémoire sur la theorie des surfaces applicables sur une surface donnée". Journal de l'École Polytechnique. 42: 72–92.
- Cutts, Elise (20 January 2026). "Two Twisty Shapes Resolve a Centuries-Old Topology Puzzle". Quanta Magazine.
- do Carmo, Manfredo P. (2016). Differential geometry of curves & surfaces (Revised & updated second edition of 1976 original ed.). Mineola, NY: Dover Publications, Inc. ISBN 978-0-486-80699-0. MR 3837152. Zbl 1352.53002.
- Kobayashi, Shoshichi; Nomizu, Katsumi (1969). Foundations of differential geometry. Volume II. Interscience Tracts in Pure and Applied Mathematics. Vol. 15. New York–London: John Wiley & Sons, Inc. ISBN 0-471-15732-5. MR 0238225. Zbl 0175.48504.
- Lawson, H. Blaine Jr; Tribuzy, Renato de Azevedo (1981). "On the mean curvature function for compact surfaces". Journal of Differential Geometry. 16: 179–183. doi:10.4310/jdg/1214436095.
- Spivak, Michael (1999a). A comprehensive introduction to differential geometry. Volume III (Third edition of 1975 original ed.). Wilmington, DE: Publish or Perish, Inc. ISBN 0-914098-72-1. MR 0532832. Zbl 1213.53001.
- Spivak, Michael (1999b). A comprehensive introduction to differential geometry. Volume IV (Third edition of 1975 original ed.). Publish or Perish, Inc. ISBN 0-914098-73-X. MR 0532833. Zbl 1213.53001.
- Struik, Dirk J. (1961). Lectures on classical differential geometry (Second edition of 1950 original ed.). London: Addison-Wesley Publishing Co. ISBN 0-486-65609-8. MR 0939369. Zbl 0105.14707.
