= Canonical connection =

In geometry (more specifically differential geometry), a canonical connection can mean either

- A canonical connection on a symmetric space that is canonically defined (as described in Ch XI of Kobayashi and Nomizu, Foundations of Differential Geometry Vol II.).
- A Chern connection, a connection of a holomorphic vector bundle with a Hermitian structure, is the unique metric connection D, such that the part which increases the anti-holomorphic type D`` annihilates holomorphic sections.
