= Le Potier's vanishing theorem =

Generalizes the Kodaira vanishing theorem for ample vector bundle

In algebraic geometry, Le Potier's vanishing theorem is an extension of the Kodaira vanishing theorem, on vector bundles. The theorem states the following

Le Potier (1975): Let X be a n-dimensional compact complex manifold and E a holomorphic vector bundle of rank r over X, here $H^{p,q}(X,E)$ is Dolbeault cohomology group, where $\Omega ^{p}_{X}$ denotes the sheaf of holomorphic p-forms on X. If E is an ample, then

$H^{p,q}(X, E) = 0$ for $p + q \geq n + r$ .

from Dolbeault theorem,

$H^{q}(X, \Omega ^{p}_{X} \otimes E ) = 0$ for $p + q \geq n + r$ .

By Serre duality, the statements are equivalent to the assertions:

$H^{i}(X, \Omega ^{j}_{X} \otimes E^* ) = 0$ for $j + i \leq n - r$ .

In case of r = 1, and let E is an ample (or positive) line bundle on X, this theorem is equivalent to the Nakano vanishing theorem. Also, Schneider (1974) found another proof.

Sommese (1978) generalizes Le Potier's vanishing theorem to k-ample and the statement as follows:

Le Potier–Sommese vanishing theorem: Let X be a n-dimensional algebraic manifold and E is a k-ample holomorphic vector bundle of rank r over X, then

$H^{p,q}(X, E) = 0$ for $p + q \geq n + r + k$ .

Demailly (1988) gave a counterexample, which is as follows:

Conjecture of Sommese (1978): Let X be a n-dimensional compact complex manifold and E a holomorphic vector bundle of rank r over X. If E is an ample, then

$H^{p,q}(X, \Lambda^a E ) = 0$ for $p + q \geq n + r - a + 1$ is false for $n=2r \geq 6 .$

== See also ==
- vanishing theorem
- Barth–Lefschetz theorem
