= Multiplier ideal =

In commutative algebra, the multiplier ideal associated to a sheaf of ideals over a complex variety and a real number c consists (locally) of the functions h such that

$$\frac{|h|^2}{\sum|f_i^2|^c}$$

is locally integrable, where the f_{i} are a finite set of local generators of the ideal. Multiplier ideals were independently introduced by Nadel (1989) (who worked with sheaves over complex manifolds rather than ideals) and Lipman (1993), who called them adjoint ideals.

Multiplier ideals are discussed in the survey articles Blickle & Lazarsfeld (2004), Siu (2005), and Lazarsfeld (2009).

== Algebraic geometry ==
In algebraic geometry, the multiplier ideal of an effective $\mathbb{Q}$-divisor measures singularities coming from the fractional parts of D. Multiplier ideals are often applied in tandem with vanishing theorems such as the Kodaira vanishing theorem and the Kawamata–Viehweg vanishing theorem.

Let X be a smooth complex variety and D an effective $\mathbb{Q}$-divisor on it. Let $\mu: X' \to X$ be a log resolution of D (e.g., Hironaka's resolution). The multiplier ideal of D is

$$J(D) = \mu_*\mathcal{O}(K_{X'/X} - [\mu^* D])$$

where $K_{X'/X}$ is the relative canonical divisor: $K_{X'/X} = K_{X'} - \mu^* K_X$. It is an ideal sheaf of $\mathcal{O}_X$. If D is integral, then $J(D) = \mathcal{O}_X(-D)$.

== See also ==
- Canonical singularity
- Test ideal
- Nadel vanishing theorem
