= Pierre Ossian Bonnet =

French mathematician (1819–1892)

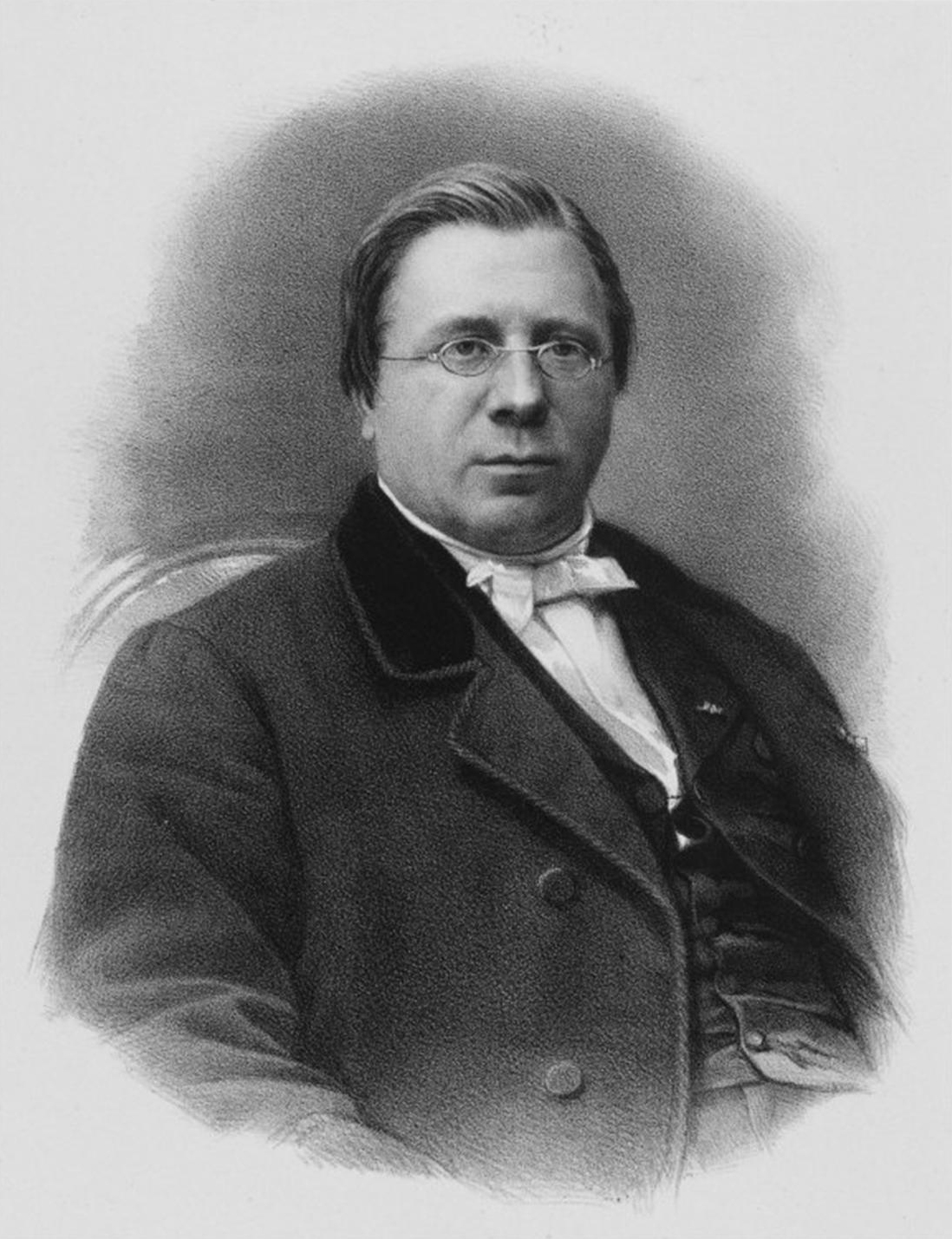
- Born: 22 December 1819; Montpellier, France
- Died: 22 June 1892 (aged 72); Paris, France
- Education: École Polytechnique; École Nationale des Ponts et Chaussées
- Known for: Bonnet family Bonnet problem Bonnet theorem Bonnet's recursion formula Bonnet–Myers theorem Gauss–Bonnet theorem
- Scientific career
- Fields: Mathematics
- Thesis: Sur le développement des fonctions en séries ordonnées suivant les fonctions Xn et Yn (1852)

Pierre Ossian Bonnet (French: [bɔnɛ]; 22 December 1819 in Montpellier – 22 June 1892 in Paris) was a French mathematician. He made some important contributions to the differential geometry of surfaces, including the Gauss–Bonnet theorem.

== Biography ==
=== Early years ===
Pierre Bonnet attended the Collège in Montpellier. In 1838 he entered the École Polytechnique in Paris. He also studied at the École Nationale des Ponts et Chaussées.

=== Middle years ===
In graduating he was offered a post as an engineer. After some thought Bonnet decided on a career in teaching and research in mathematics instead.

Turning down the engineering post had not been an easy decision since Bonnet was not well off financially. He had to do private tutoring so that he could afford to accept a position at the Ecole Polytechnique in 1844.

One year before this, in 1843, Bonnet had written a paper on the convergence of series with positive terms. Another paper on series in 1849 was to earn him an award from the Brussels Academy. However between these two papers on series, Bonnet had begun his work on differential geometry in 1844.

Bonnet was elected to the Academy of Sciences in 1862 to replace Biot. He defeated Bour for this position. From 1868 Bonnet assisted Chasles at the Ecole Polytechnique, and three years later he became a director of studies there. In addition to this post he also taught at the Ecole Normale Supérieure.

In 1878 Bonnet succeeded Le Verrier to the chair at the Sorbonne, then in 1883 he succeeded Liouville as a member of the Bureau des Longitudes.

Bonnet did important work on differential geometry, a topic that was also being investigated in France by Serret, Frenet, Bertrand and Puiseux. Here Bonnet made major contributions to the concept of curvature. In particular, he published a formula relating the surface integral of the Gauss curvature to the Euler characteristic of the surface and the line integral of the geodesic curvature of its boundary; this result is now known as the Gauss–Bonnet theorem. Gauss was known to have previously discovered a special case of this fundamental result, but had never published it.

Independently of Ferdinand Minding, Bonnet showed the invariance of the Gauss curvature of a surface under bending. Between 1844 and 1867 he published a series of papers on the differential geometry of surfaces. In 1859 he submitted an important memoir for the Grand Prize of the Paris Academy. In modern terminology, the prize was offered for determining all possible local isometric embeddings in Euclidean 3-space of a surface with given Riemannian metric ("line element").

== See also ==
- Topics named after Carl Friedrich Gauss
