= Holomorphic tangent bundle =

In mathematics, and especially complex geometry, the holomorphic tangent bundle of a complex manifold $M$ is the holomorphic analogue of the tangent bundle of a smooth manifold. The fibre of the holomorphic tangent bundle over a point is the holomorphic tangent space, which is the tangent space of the underlying smooth manifold, given the structure of a complex vector space via the almost complex structure $J$ of the complex manifold $M$.

== Definition ==
Given a complex manifold $M$ of complex dimension $n$, its tangent bundle as a smooth vector bundle is a real rank $2n$ vector bundle $TM$ on $M$. The integrable almost complex structure $J$ corresponding to the complex structure on the manifold $M$ is an endomorphism $J: TM \to TM$ with the property that $J^2 = -\operatorname{Id}$. After complexifying the real tangent bundle to $TM\otimes \mathbb{C} \to M$, the endomorphism $J$ may be extended complex-linearly to an endomorphism $J:TM\otimes \mathbb{C} \to TM\otimes \mathbb{C}$ defined by $J(X+iY) = J(X) + i J(Y)$ for vectors $X,Y$ in $TM$.

Since $J^2 = -\operatorname{Id}$, $J$ has eigenvalues $i, -i$ on the complexified tangent bundle, and $TM\otimes \mathbb{C}$ therefore splits as a direct sum

$$TM\otimes \mathbb{C} = T^{1,0} M \oplus T^{0,1} M$$

where $T^{1,0} M$ and $T^{0,1} M$ are the $i$ and $-i$-eigenbundles of the complex-linear endomorphism $J$. The holomorphic tangent bundle of $M$ is the vector bundle $T^{1,0} M$, and the anti-holomorphic tangent bundle is the vector bundle $T^{0,1} M$.

The vector bundles $T^{1,0} M$ and $T^{0,1} M$ are naturally complex vector subbundles of the complex vector bundle $TM\otimes \mathbb{C}$, and their duals may be taken. The holomorphic cotangent bundle is the dual of the holomorphic tangent bundle, and is written $T_{1,0}^* M$. Similarly the anti-holomorphic cotangent bundle is the dual of the anti-holomorphic tangent bundle, and is written $T_{0,1}^* M$. The holomorphic and anti-holomorphic (co)tangent bundles are interchanged by conjugation, which gives a real-linear (but not complex linear!) isomorphism $T^{1,0} M \to T^{0,1} M$.

The holomorphic tangent bundle $T^{1,0} M$ is isomorphic as a real vector bundle of rank $2n$ to the regular tangent bundle $TM$. The isomorphism is given by the composition $TM\hookrightarrow TM\otimes \mathbb{C} \xrightarrow{\operatorname{pr}_{1,0}} T^{1,0} M$ of inclusion into the complexified tangent bundle, and then projection onto the $i$-eigenbundle.

The canonical bundle is defined by $K_M = \Lambda^n T_{1,0}^* M$.

== Alternative local description ==
In a local holomorphic chart $\varphi=(z^1,\dots,z^n): U \to \mathbb{C}^n$ of $M$, one has distinguished real coordinates $(x^1,\dots,x^n,y^1,\dots,y^n)$ defined by $z^j = x^j + i y^j$ for each $j=1,\dots,n$. These give distinguished complex-valued one-forms $dz^j = dx^j + i dy^j, d\bar{z}^j = dx^j - i dy^j$ on $U$. Dual to these complex-valued one-forms are the complex-valued vector fields (that is, sections of the complexified tangent bundle),

$$\frac{\partial}{\partial z^j} = \frac{1}{2}\left(\frac{\partial}{\partial x^j} - i \frac{\partial}{\partial y^j}\right), \quad \frac{\partial}{\partial \bar{z}^j} = \frac{1}{2}\left(\frac{\partial}{\partial x^j} + i \frac{\partial}{\partial y^j}\right).$$

Taken together, these vector fields form a frame for $\left.TM\otimes \mathbb{C}\right|_U$, the restriction of the complexified tangent bundle to $U$. As such, these vector fields also split the complexified tangent bundle into two subbundles

$$\left.T^{1,0} M\right|_U := \operatorname{Span} \left\{ \frac{\partial}{\partial z^j} \right\},\quad \left.T^{0,1} M\right|_U := \operatorname{Span} \left\{ \frac{\partial}{\partial \bar{z}^j} \right\}.$$

Under a holomorphic change of coordinates, these two subbundles of $\left.TM\otimes \mathbb{C}\right|_U$ are preserved, and so by covering $M$ by holomorphic charts one obtains a splitting of the complexified tangent bundle. This is precisely the splitting into the holomorphic and anti-holomorphic tangent bundles previously described. Similarly the complex-valued one-forms $dz^j$ and $d\bar{z}^j$ provide the splitting of the complexified cotangent bundle into the holomorphic and anti-holomorphic cotangent bundles.

From this perspective, the name holomorphic tangent bundle becomes transparent. Namely, the transition functions for the holomorphic tangent bundle, with local frames generated by the $\partial/\partial z^j$, are given by the Jacobian matrix of the transition functions of $M$. Explicitly, if we have two charts $U_{\alpha}, U_{\beta}$ with two sets of coordinates $z^j, w^k$, then

$$\frac{\partial}{\partial z^j} = \sum_k \frac{\partial w^k}{\partial z^j} \frac{\partial}{\partial w^k}.$$

Since the coordinate functions are holomorphic, so are any derivatives of them, and so the transition functions of the holomorphic tangent bundle are also holomorphic. Thus the holomorphic tangent bundle is a genuine holomorphic vector bundle. Similarly the holomorphic cotangent bundle is a genuine holomorphic vector bundle, with transition functions given by the inverse transpose of the Jacobian matrix. Notice that the anti-holomorphic tangent and cotangent bundles do not have holomorphic transition functions, but anti-holomorphic ones.

In terms of the local frames described, the almost-complex structure $J$ acts by

$$J: \frac{\partial}{\partial z^j} \mapsto i\frac{\partial}{\partial z^j}, \quad \frac{\partial}{\partial \bar{z}^j} \mapsto -i \frac{\partial}{\partial \bar{z}^j},$$

or in real coordinates by

$$J: \frac{\partial}{\partial x^j} \mapsto \frac{\partial}{\partial y^j}, \quad \frac{\partial}{\partial y^j} \mapsto - \frac{\partial}{\partial x^j}.$$

== Holomorphic vector fields and differential forms ==
Since the holomorphic tangent and cotangent bundles have the structure of holomorphic vector bundles, there are distinguished holomorphic sections. A holomorphic vector field is a holomorphic section of $T^{1,0} M$. A holomorphic one-form is a holomorphic section of $T_{1,0}^* M$. By taking exterior powers of $T_{1,0}^*$, one can define holomorphic $p$-forms for integers $p$. The Cauchy-Riemann operator of $M$ may be extended from functions to complex-valued differential forms, and the holomorphic sections of the holomorphic cotangent bundle agree with the complex-valued differential $(p,0)$-forms that are annihilated by $\bar{\partial}$. For more details see complex differential forms.

== See also ==
- Almost complex manifold
- Hermitian manifold
