= Andrew J. Sommese =

American mathematician

Andrew John Sommese (born 3 May 3, 1948 in New York City) is an American mathematician, specializing in algebraic geometry.

Sommese received in 1969 from Fordham University a bachelor's degree and in 1973 from Princeton University a PhD under Phillip Griffiths with thesis Algebraic properties of the period-mapping. As a postdoc Sommese was from 1973 to 1975 a Gibbs Instructor at Yale University and was for the academic year 1975–1976 at the Institute for Advanced Study. He became at Cornell University in 1975 an assistant professor and at the University of Notre Dame in 1979 an associate professor and in 1983 a full professor. At the University of Notre Dame he was from 1988 to 1992 the chair of the mathematics department and from 1987 to 1992 the co-director of the Center for Applied Mathematics. In 1994, he was named Duncan Professor for mathematics, and in 2020, he became Professor Emeritus.

Sommese deals with numerical algebraic geometry (solution of polynomial equation systems) with applications, e.g. in robotics. For such applications he, with colleagues, developed software (such as Bertini) and cluster-software (i.e. software for computer clusters). He also deals with the numerical analysis of systems of nonlinear differential equations.

He was a visiting professor at the University of Göttingen (1977) and the University of Bonn (1978/79) and a visiting scientist at the Max Planck Institute for Mathematics in Bonn.

In 1993 he received the Humboldt Prize. In 1973 he was a Sloan Research Fellow. From 1986 to 1993 he was a co-editor of Manuscripta Mathematica and since 2000 is a co-editor for Advances in Geometry. He was elected a Fellow of the American Mathematical Society in 2012 and a Fellow of the Society for Industrial and Applied Mathematics in 2017.

His doctoral students include Sandra Di Rocco, Mark Andrea de Cataldo, Jaroslaw Wisniewski, and Jonathan Hauenstein.

== Selected publications ==
- with Bernard Shiffman: Vanishing theories on complex manifolds, Progress in Mathematics 56, Birkhäuser Verlag 1985
- with Mauro Beltrametti: The adjunction theory of complex projective varieties, De Gruyter 1995
- with Charles Wampler: Numerical solution of polynomial systems arising in engineering and science, World Scientific 2005
- as editor with Alicia Dickenstein and Frank-Olaf Schreyer: Algorithms in Algebraic Geometry, Springer Verlag 2008
- with Daniel J. Bates, Jonathan D. Hauenstein, and Charles W. Wampler: Numerically solving polynomial systems with Bertini, SIAM 2013 Bertini™ Home Page

== See also ==
- Bogomolov–Sommese vanishing theorem
