= Di Rocco =

Di Rocco is an Italian surname. Notable people with this name include:

- Alex Di Rocco (born 1970), French footballer
- Angelo Di Rocco (1896–1968), Italian politician
- Antonio Di Rocco (born 1977), Italian singer-songwriter
- Michele di Rocco (born 1982), Italian boxer of Romani origin
- Renato Di Rocco (born 1947), Italian sports executive
- Sandra Di Rocco (born 1967), Italian-Swedish mathematician
