= Hermitian manifold =

Concept in differential geometry

In mathematics, and more specifically in differential geometry, a Hermitian manifold is the complex analogue of a Riemannian manifold. More precisely, a Hermitian manifold is a complex manifold with a smoothly varying Hermitian inner product on each (holomorphic) tangent space. One can also define a Hermitian manifold as a real manifold with a Riemannian metric that preserves a complex structure.

A complex structure is essentially an almost complex structure with an integrability condition, and this condition yields a unitary structure (U(n) structure) on the manifold. By dropping this condition, we get an almost Hermitian manifold.

On any almost Hermitian manifold, we can introduce a fundamental 2-form (or cosymplectic structure) that depends only on the chosen metric and the almost complex structure. This form is always non-degenerate. With the extra integrability condition that it is closed (i.e., it is a symplectic form), we get an almost Kähler structure. If both the almost complex structure and the fundamental form are integrable, then we have a Kähler structure.

== Formal definition ==
A Hermitian metric on a complex vector bundle $E$ over a smooth manifold $M$ is a smoothly varying positive-definite Hermitian form on each fiber. Such a metric can be viewed as a smooth global section $h$ of the vector bundle $(E\otimes\overline{E})^*$ such that for every point $p$ in $M$,
$$h_p\mathord{\left(\eta, \bar\zeta\right)} = \overline{h_p\mathord{\left(\zeta, \bar\eta\right)}}$$
for all $\zeta$, $\eta$ in the fiber $E_{p}$ and
$$h_p\mathord{\left(\zeta, \bar\zeta\right)} > 0$$
for all nonzero $\zeta$ in $E_{p}$.

A Hermitian manifold is a complex manifold with a Hermitian metric on its holomorphic tangent bundle. Likewise, an almost Hermitian manifold is an almost complex manifold with a Hermitian metric on its holomorphic tangent bundle.

On a Hermitian manifold the metric can be written in local holomorphic coordinates $(z^\alpha)$ as
$$h = h_{\alpha\bar\beta}\,dz^\alpha \otimes d\bar z^\beta$$
where $h_{\alpha\bar\beta}$ are the components of a positive-definite Hermitian matrix.

== Riemannian metric and associated form ==
A Hermitian metric h on an (almost) complex manifold M defines a Riemannian metric g on the underlying smooth manifold. The metric g is defined to be the real part of h:
$$g = {1 \over 2}\left(h + \bar h\right).$$

The form g is a symmetric bilinear form on TM^{C}, the complexified tangent bundle. Since g is equal to its conjugate it is the complexification of a real form on TM. The symmetry and positive-definiteness of g on TM follow from the corresponding properties of h. In local holomorphic coordinates the metric g can be written
$$g = {1 \over 2}h_{\alpha\bar\beta}\,\left(dz^\alpha\otimes d\bar z^\beta + d\bar z^\beta\otimes dz^\alpha\right).$$

One can also associate to h a complex differential form ω of degree (1,1). The form ω is defined as minus the imaginary part of h:
$$\omega = {i \over 2}\left(h - \bar h\right).$$

Again since ω is equal to its conjugate it is the complexification of a real form on TM. The form ω is called variously the associated (1,1) form, the fundamental form, or the Hermitian form. In local holomorphic coordinates ω can be written
$$\omega = {i \over 2}h_{\alpha\bar\beta}\,dz^\alpha\wedge d\bar z^\beta,$$
where $dz^{\alpha}\wedge d\bar z^{\beta}=dz^{\alpha}\otimes d\bar z^{\beta}-d\bar z^{\beta}\otimes dz^{\alpha}.$

It is clear from the coordinate representations that any one of the three forms h, g, and ω uniquely determine the other two. The Riemannian metric g and associated (1,1) form ω are related by the almost complex structure J as follows
$$\begin{align}
\omega(u, v) &= g(Ju, v)\\
g(u, v) &= \omega(u, Jv)
\end{align}$$
for all complex tangent vectors u and v. The Hermitian metric h can be recovered from g and ω via the identity
$$h = g - i\omega.$$

All three forms h, g, and ω preserve the almost complex structure J. That is,
$$\begin{align}
h(Ju, Jv) &= h(u, v) \\
g(Ju, Jv) &= g(u, v) \\
\omega(Ju, Jv) &= \omega(u, v)
\end{align}$$
for all complex tangent vectors u and v.

A Hermitian structure on an (almost) complex manifold M can therefore be specified by either

1. a Hermitian metric h as above,
2. a Riemannian metric g that preserves the almost complex structure J, or
3. a nondegenerate 2-form ω which preserves J and is positive-definite in the sense that ω(u, Ju) > 0 for all nonzero real tangent vectors u.

Note that many authors call g itself the Hermitian metric.

== Properties ==
Every (almost) complex manifold admits a Hermitian metric. This follows directly from the analogous statement for Riemannian metric. Given an arbitrary Riemannian metric g on an almost complex manifold M one can construct a new metric g′ compatible with the almost complex structure J in an obvious manner:
$$g'(u, v) = {1 \over 2}\left(g(u, v) + g(Ju, Jv)\right).$$

Choosing a Hermitian metric on an almost complex manifold M is equivalent to a choice of U(n)-structure on M; that is, a reduction of the structure group of the frame bundle of M from GL(n, C) to the unitary group U(n). A unitary frame on an almost Hermitian manifold is complex linear frame which is orthonormal with respect to the Hermitian metric. The unitary frame bundle of M is the principal U(n)-bundle of all unitary frames.

Every almost Hermitian manifold M has a canonical volume form which is just the Riemannian volume form determined by g. This form is given in terms of the associated (1,1)-form ω by
$$\mathrm{vol}_M = \frac{\omega^n}{n!} \in \Omega^{n,n}(M)$$
where ω^{n} is the wedge product of ω with itself n times. The volume form is therefore a real (n,n)-form on M. In local holomorphic coordinates the volume form is given by
$$\mathrm{vol}_M = \left(\frac{i}{2}\right)^n \det\left(h_{\alpha\bar\beta}\right)\, dz^1 \wedge d\bar z^1 \wedge \dotsb \wedge dz^n \wedge d\bar z^n.$$

One can also consider a hermitian metric on a holomorphic vector bundle.

== Kähler manifolds ==
The most important class of Hermitian manifolds are Kähler manifolds. These are Hermitian manifolds for which the Hermitian form ω is closed:
$$d\omega = 0\,.$$
In this case the form ω is called a Kähler form. A Kähler form is a symplectic form, and so Kähler manifolds are naturally symplectic manifolds.

An almost Hermitian manifold whose associated (1,1)-form is closed is naturally called an almost Kähler manifold. Any symplectic manifold admits a compatible almost complex structure making it into an almost Kähler manifold.

=== Integrability ===
A Kähler manifold is an almost Hermitian manifold satisfying an integrability condition. This can be stated in several equivalent ways.

Let (M, g, ω, J) be an almost Hermitian manifold of real dimension 2n and let ∇ be the Levi-Civita connection of g. The following are equivalent conditions for M to be Kähler:

- ω is closed and J is integrable,
- ∇J = 0,
- ∇ω = 0,
- the holonomy group of ∇ is contained in the unitary group U(n) associated to J,

The equivalence of these conditions corresponds to the "2 out of 3" property of the unitary group.

In particular, if M is a Hermitian manifold, the condition dω = 0 is equivalent to the apparently much stronger conditions ∇ω = ∇J = 0. The richness of Kähler theory is due in part to these properties.

== Literature ==
- Griffiths, Phillip; Joseph Harris (1994) [1978]. Principles of Algebraic Geometry. Wiley Classics Library. New York: Wiley-Interscience. ISBN 0-471-05059-8.
- Kobayashi, Shoshichi; Katsumi Nomizu (1996) [1963]. Foundations of Differential Geometry, Vol. 2. Wiley Classics Library. New York: Wiley Interscience. ISBN 0-471-15732-5.
- Kodaira, Kunihiko (1986). Complex Manifolds and Deformation of Complex Structures. Classics in Mathematics. New York: Springer. ISBN 3-540-22614-1.
- Huybrechts, Daniel (2004-11-18). Complex geometry: An introduction. Universitext. Springer Science+Business Media. ISBN 978-3540212904.
