= Ramanujam vanishing theorem =

In algebraic geometry, the Ramanujam vanishing theorem is an extension of the Kodaira vanishing theorem due to Ramanujam (1972), that in particular gives conditions for the vanishing of first cohomology groups of coherent sheaves on a surface. The Kawamata–Viehweg vanishing theorem generalizes it.

== See also ==
- Mumford vanishing theorem
