= Hortense Haudebourt-Lescot =

French painter (1784–1845)

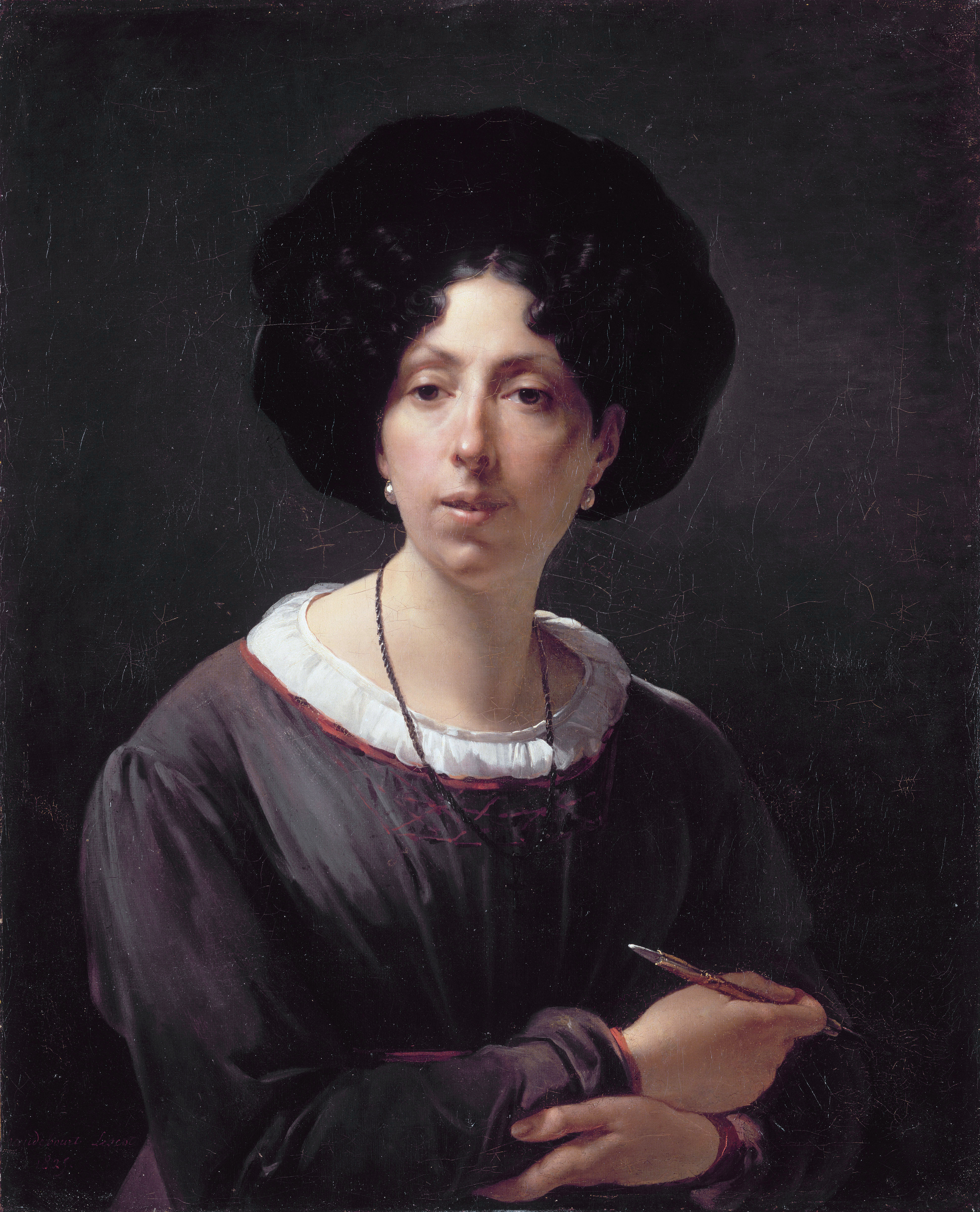
Self-Portrait (1825), modeled after Baldassare Castiglione by Raphael.

Hortense Haudebourt-Lescot, born Antoinette Cécile Hortense Viel (French: [ɔʁtɑ̃s odəbuʁ lɛsko]; 14 December 1784 – 2 January 1845), was a French painter, mainly of genre and historical scenes.

== Biography ==
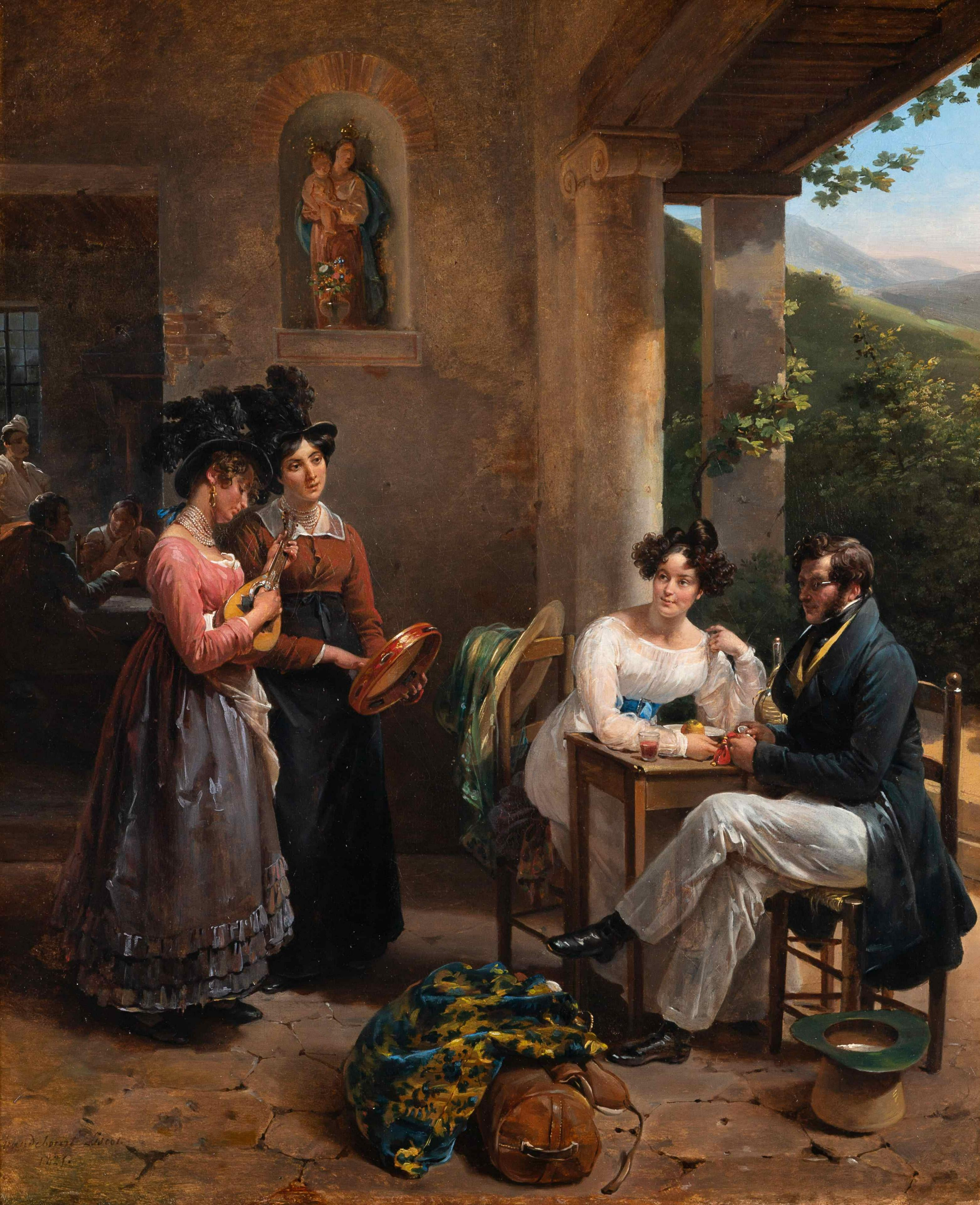
The Wedding Trip, 1825

She was born in Paris to Jean-Baptiste Viel, a perfumer, and his wife Cécile, née Lejeune. Her mother became a widow two years later and remarried; to Jean-Louis Lescot, a pharmacist.

At the age of seven, she began her studies with Guillaume Guillon-Lethière, a popular history painter and family friend. When he was appointed director of the French Academy in Rome in 1807, she and several other artists followed him. They arrived in 1808, and she remained until 1816. There she depicted the customs and costumes of Italian peasants in great detail, which influenced much of her later work. During this time, she began signing her works with the name "Lescot".

Beginning in 1811, she sent her paintings to Paris, to be exhibited at the Salon. Her work attracted the attention of the Duchess of Berry who, in 1816, appointed her to be her personal painter. In 1820, she married the architect Louis-Pierre Haudebourt (1788–1849), with whom she had a son. Their home became a gathering place for the artistic and literary elite.

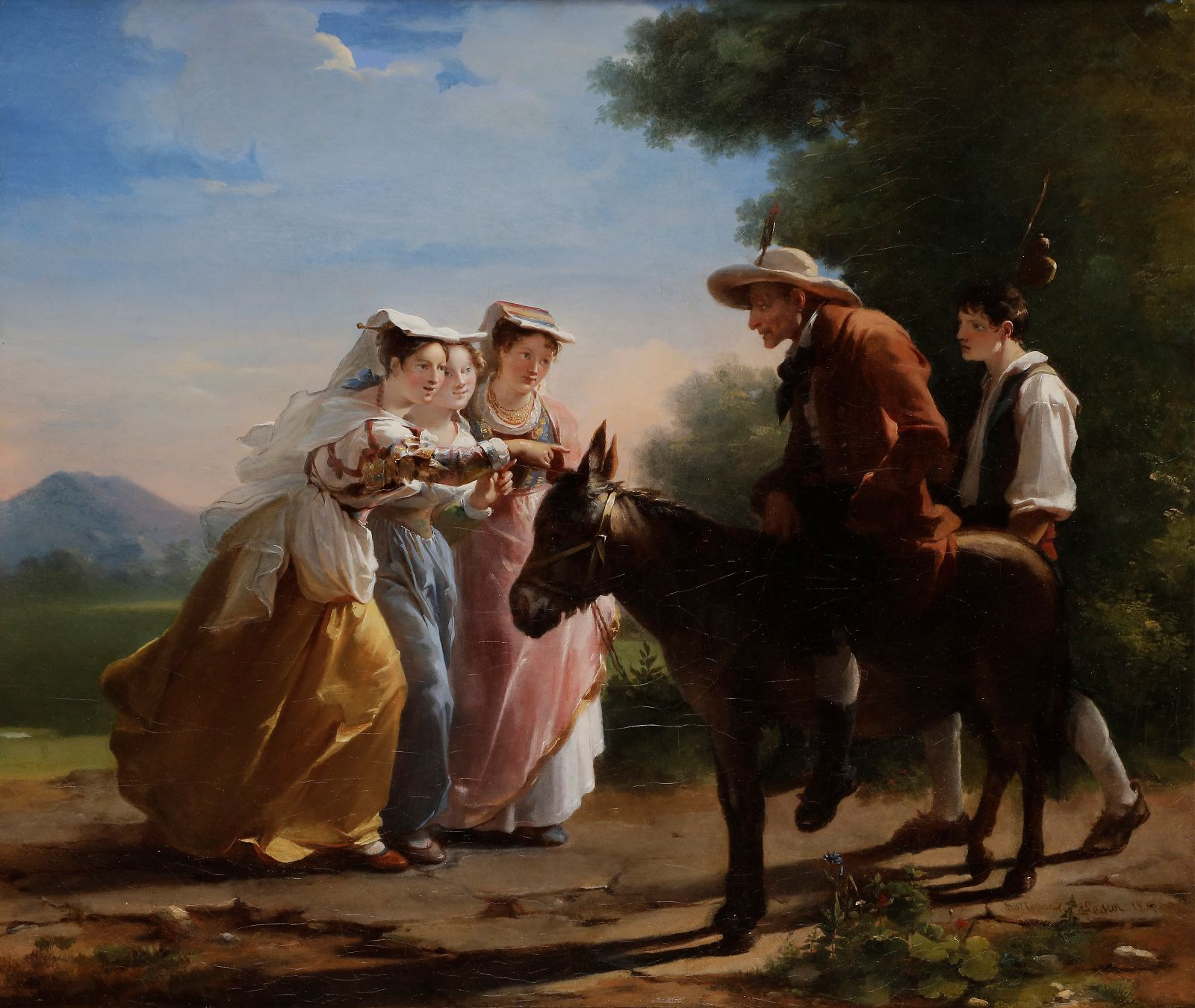
The Miller, His Son, and the Donkey

As a teacher, Haudebourt-Lescot's pupils included the painters Herminie Déhérain and Marie-Ernestine Serret.

She died in Paris on 2 January 1845. Her works may be seen at the Louvre Museum, the Musée des Augustins in Toulouse, and at the Musée Jean de La Fontaine.

== Gallery ==
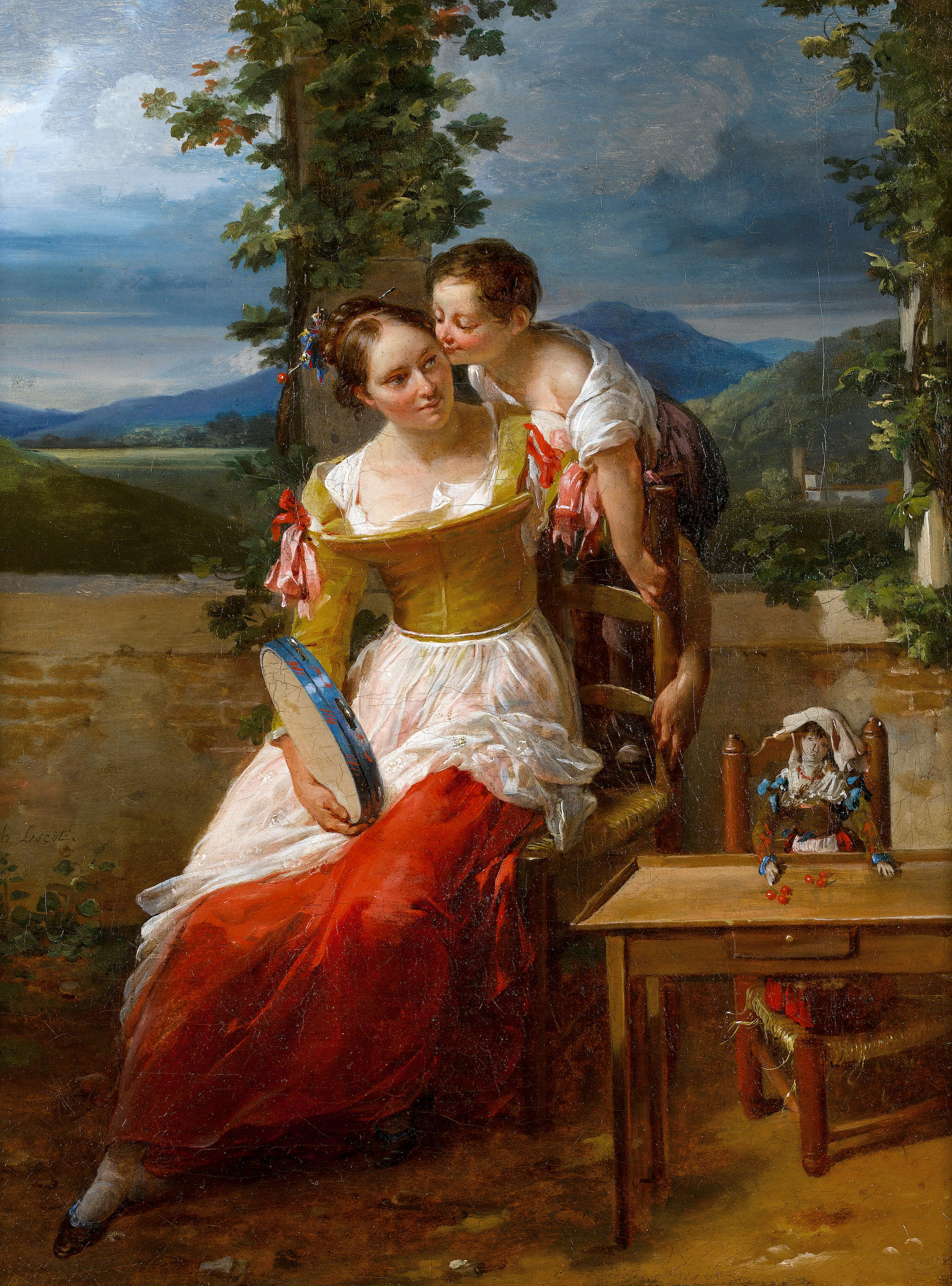
A Mother and Child Playing on a Terrace with a Tambourine and a puppet, 1810/1819

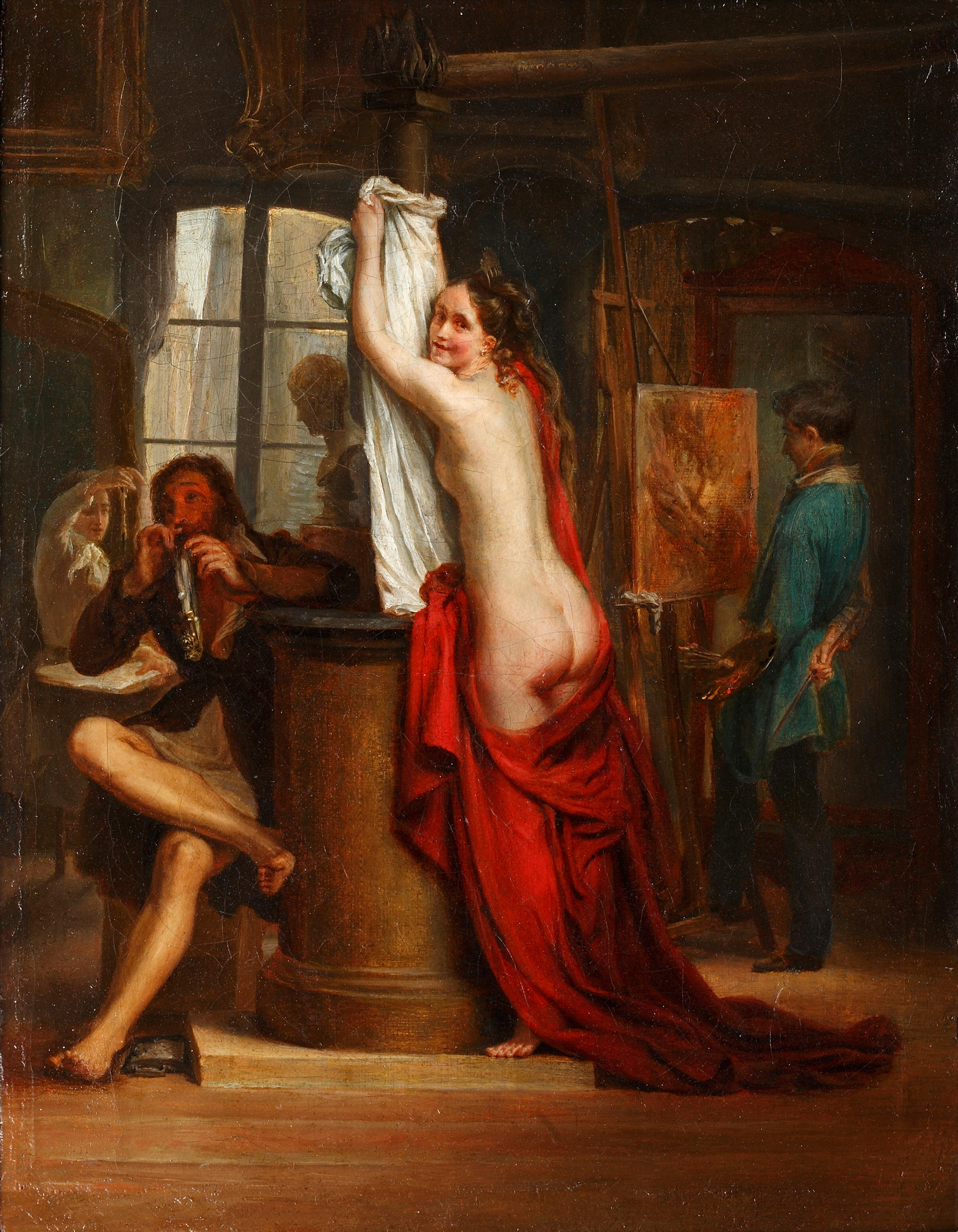
A Nude Model in an Artist's Studio

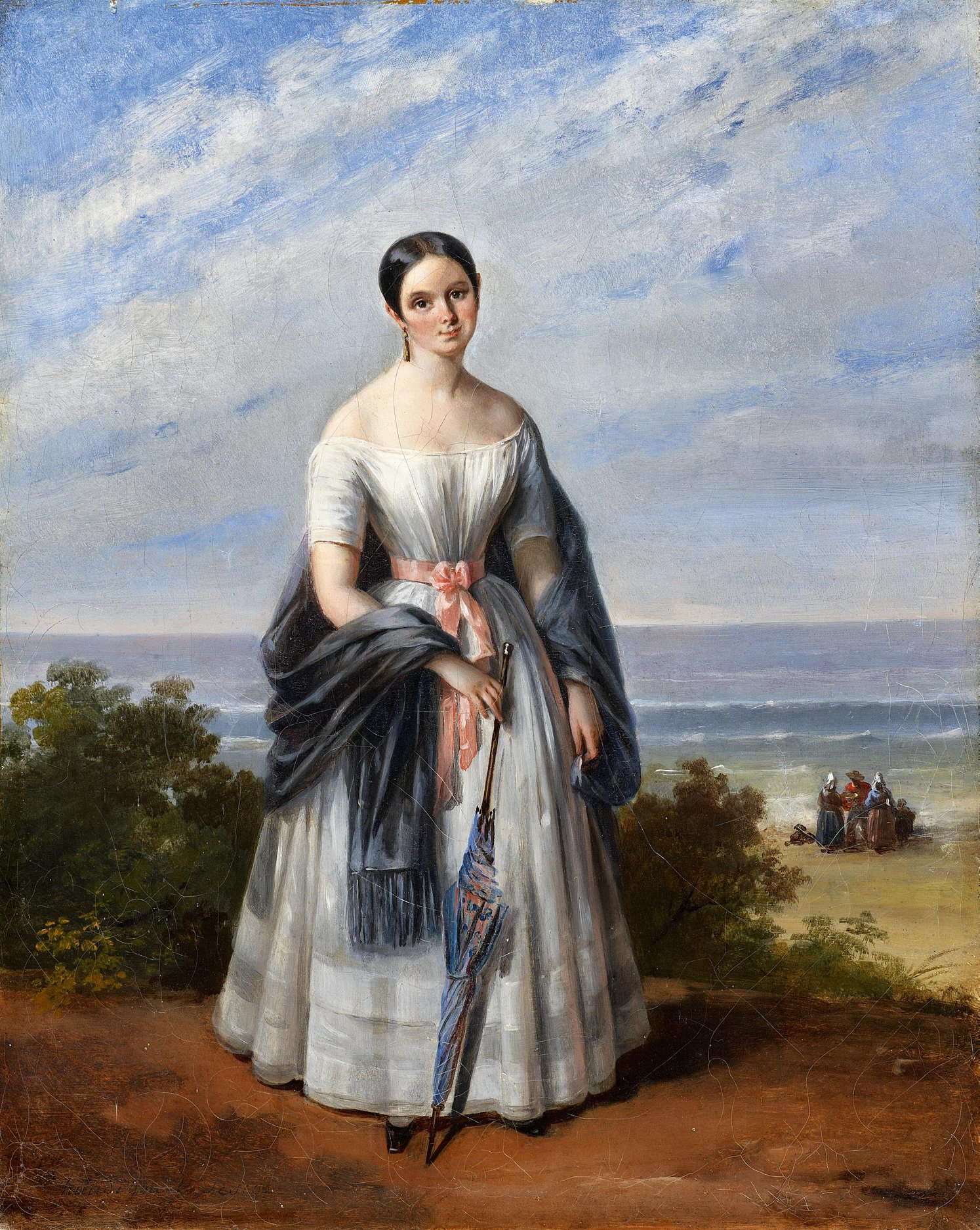
Portrait of the Countess of Espinay in a landscape or Portrait of a Noble Young Lady at the Beach

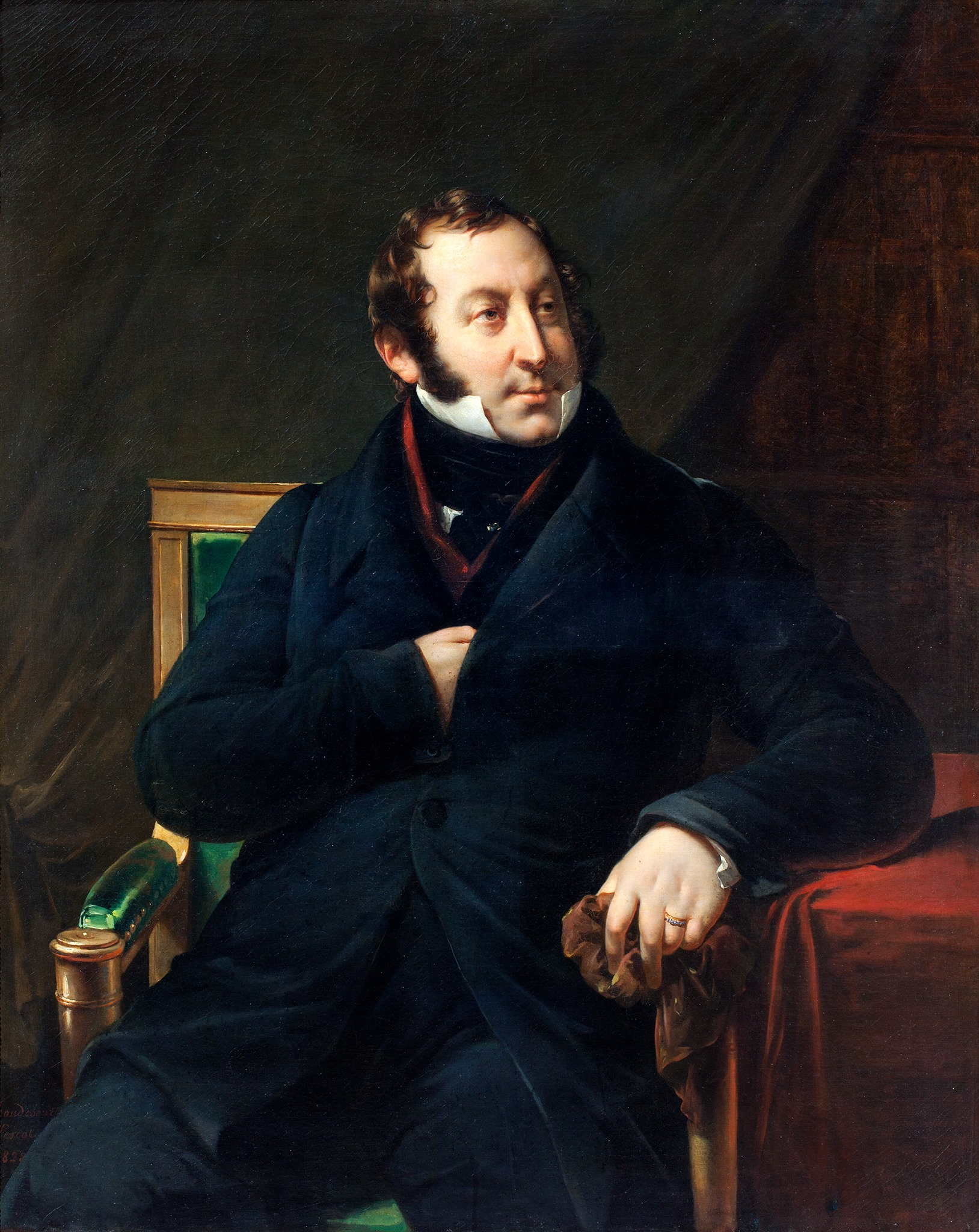
Portrait of Gioachino Rossini, 1828
