= Mumford vanishing theorem =

In algebraic geometry, the Mumford vanishing theorem proved by Mumford in 1967 states that if L is a semi-ample invertible sheaf with Iitaka dimension at least 2 on a complex projective manifold, then

$$H^i(X,L^{-1})=0\text{ for }i = 0,1.\$$

The Mumford vanishing theorem is related to the Ramanujam vanishing theorem, and is generalized by the Kawamata–Viehweg vanishing theorem.
