= Bogomolov–Sommese vanishing theorem =

Theorem in algebraic geometry

In algebraic geometry, the Bogomolov–Sommese vanishing theorem is a result related to the Kodaira–Itaka dimension. It is named after Fedor Bogomolov and Andrew Sommese. Its statement has differing versions:

Bogomolov–Sommese vanishing theorem for snc pair: Let X be a projective manifold (smooth projective variety), D a simple normal crossing divisor (snc divisor) and $A \subseteq \Omega ^{p} _ {X} (\log D)$ an invertible subsheaf. Then the Kodaira–Itaka dimension $\kappa(A)$ is not greater than p.

This result is equivalent to the statement that:

$$H^{0}\left(X,A^{- 1} \otimes \Omega ^{p}_{X} (\log D) \right) = 0$$

for every complex projective snc pair $(X, D)$ and every invertible sheaf $A \in \mathrm{Pic}(X)$ with $\kappa(A) > p$.

Therefore, this theorem is called the vanishing theorem.

Bogomolov–Sommese vanishing theorem for lc pair: Let (X,D) be a log canonical pair, where X is projective. If $A \subseteq\Omega ^{[p]}_{X} (\log \lfloor D \rfloor)$ is a $\mathbb{Q}$-Cartier reflexive subsheaf of rank one, then $\kappa(A) \leq p$.

== See also ==
- Bogomolov–Miyaoka–Yau inequality
- Vanishing theorem (disambiguation)
