= Test ideal =

A test ideal is a positive characteristic analog of a multiplier ideal in, say, the field of complex numbers. Test ideals are used in the study of singularities in algebraic geometry in positive characteristic.
