= Frank-Olaf Schreyer =

German mathematician

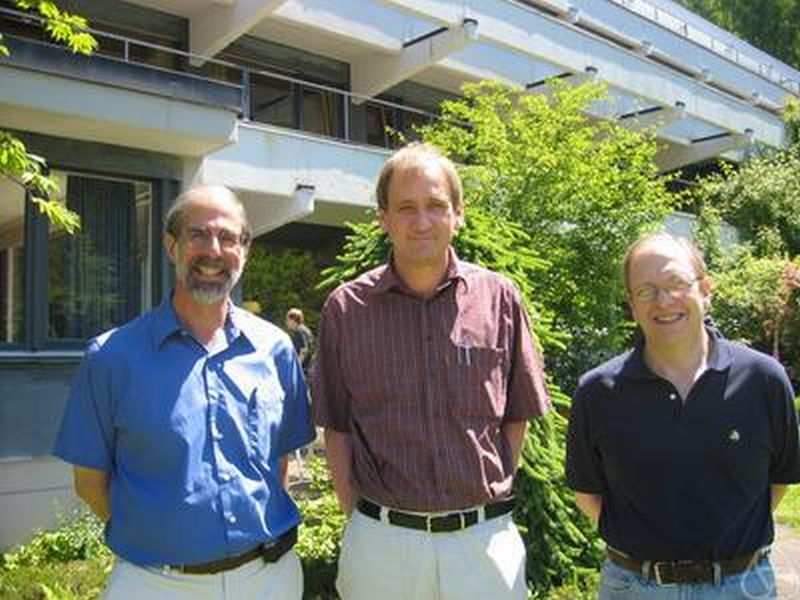
David Eisenbud (left), Frank-Olaf Schreyer (middle), Joseph Daniel Harris (right), Oberwolfach 2006

Frank-Olaf Schreyer is a German mathematician, specializing in algebraic geometry and algorithmic algebraic geometry.

Schreyer received in 1983 his PhD from Brandeis University with thesis Syzgies of Curves with Special Pencils under the supervision of David Eisenbud. Schreyer was a professor at University of Bayreuth and is since 2002 a professor at Saarland University.

He is involved in the development of (algorithmic) algebraic geometry advanced by David Eisenbud. Much of Schreyer's research deals with syzygy theory and the development of algorithms for the calculation of syzygies.

In 2010 he was an invited speaker (jointly with David Eisenbud) at the International Congress of Mathematicians in Hyderabad. In 2012 he was elected a Fellow of the American Mathematical Society.

== Selected publications ==
- Decker, Wolfram; Schreyer, Frank-Olaf (1986). "On the uniqueness of the Horrocks-Mumford-bundle". Mathematische Annalen. 273 (3): 415–443. doi:10.1007/bf01450731. MR 0824431. S2CID 120828663.
- Schreyer, Frank-Olaf (1986). "Syzygies of canonical curves and special linear series". Mathematische Annalen. 275 (1): 105–137. doi:10.1007/bf01458587. MR 0849058. S2CID 121564282.
- Buchweitz, Ragnar-Olaf; Greuel, Gert-Martin; Schreyer, Frank-Olaf (1987). "Cohen-Macaulay modules on hypersurface singularities II". Inventiones Mathematicae. 88 (1): 165–182. Bibcode:1987InMat..88..165B. doi:10.1007/bf01405096. hdl:1807/9843. MR 0877011. S2CID 55749574.
- with D. Eisenbud, H. Lange, G. Martens: The Clifford dimension of a projective curve, Compositio Math., vol. 72, 1989, pp., 173–204
- A standard basis approach to syzygies of canonical curves, J. reine angew. Math., vol. 421, 1991, pp. 83–123
- as editor with Klaus Hulek, Thomas Peternell, Michael Schneider: Complex Algebraic Varieties, Lecture Notes in Mathematics, Springer Verlag 1992 (Konferenz Bayreuth 1990)
- with W. Decker, L. Ein: Construction of surfaces in $\mathbb P^4$, J. Alg. Geom., vol. 2, 1993, pp. 185–237
- with K. Ranestad: Varieties of sums of power, Journal für die reine und angewandte Mathematik, 2000, pp. 147–181
- with David Eisenbud: Sheaf Cohomology and Free Resolutions over Exterior Algebras, Arxiv 2000
- with W. Decker: Computational Algebraic Geometry Today, in: C. Ciliberto et al. (eds.), Application of Algebraic Geometry to Coding Theory, Physics and Computation, Kluwer 2001, pp. 65–119
- with D. Eisenbud, J. Weyman: Resultants and Chow forms via exterior syzygies, Journal of the American Mathematical Society, vol. 16, 2003, pp. 537–579
- with D. Eisenbud, G. Fløystad: Sheaf cohomology and free resolutions over exterior algebras, Transactions of the American Mathematical Society, vol. 355, 2003, pp. 4397–4426, Arxiv
- as editor with Alicia Dickenstein, Andrew J. Sommese: Algorithms in Algebraic Geometry, Springer 2008
- with D. Eisenbud: Betti numbers of graded modules and cohomology of vector bundles, Journal of the American Mathematical Society, vol. 22, 2009, pp. 859–888
- with David Eisenbud: Betti Numbers of Syzygies and Cohomology of Coherent Sheaves, ICM 2010, Hyderabad, Arxiv
- with Burcin Erocal et al.: Refined Algorithms to Compute Syzygies, J. Symb. Comput., vol. 74, 2016, pp. 308–327, Arxiv
