= Serret =

Serret is a surname. Notable people with the surname include:

- Dulce María Serret (1898–1989), Cuban pianist and music teacher
- Joseph Alfred Serret (1819–1885), French mathematician
- Marie-Ernestine Serret (1812–1884), French painter and pastellist
- Pepe Serret Borda ( 1941-1993), Spanish businessman
- Meritxell Serret (born 1975), Spanish politician
- Virginia Serret (1914–1958), Mexican actress
