= Janis Oldham =

American mathematician

Janis Marie Oldham (March 31, 1956 – July 14, 2021) was an American mathematician specializing in differential geometry and mathematics education and known for her efforts in mentoring mathematics students, especially those from disadvantaged backgrounds.

== Early life and education ==
Oldham was African American. She was born in Indianapolis, Indiana on March 31, 1956, and graduated from North Central High School (Indianapolis) in 1974. She became an undergraduate at the University of Chicago, majored in mathematics, and graduated with a Bachelor of Arts in 1978.

After going to Purdue University and earning a master's degree in mathematics in 1980, she went to the University of California, Berkeley for doctoral study, completing her Ph.D. in mathematics in 1990. Her dissertation, Connections in Super Principal Fiber Bundles, concerned connections in fiber bundles, mathematical structures used to transport geometric information from one part of a topological space to another. It was supervised by Shoshichi Kobayashi.

== Career and later life ==
After completing her Ph.D., Davis became an instructor of mathematics at the University of California, Davis and then, in 1992, an assistant professor at North Carolina A&T State University, a historically black public university. Ten years later, she was still one of only a very small number of African American women teaching university-level mathematics in the US. She earned tenure there and remained there for the rest of her career, until retiring shortly before her death. She died on July 14, 2021.

== Service and mentorship ==
Oldham was "a passionate math mentor and professor", "particularly interested in events and activities that promoted mathematical excellence for underrepresented minorities". She was active as a conference organizer and newsletter editor for the National Association of Mathematicians, a mathematical organization particularly focusing on African Americans in mathematics, and for the Mathematical Association of America, which focuses on postsecondary mathematics education. She was also a leader in the EDGE program for mentoring beginning mathematics graduate students.

== Recognition ==
In 2005, Oldham was the winner of the Etta Z. Falconer Award for Mentoring and Commitment to Diversity of Spelman College and the Infinite Possibilities Conference Steering Committee, given to "individuals who have demonstrated a professional commitment to mentoring and increasing diversity in the sciences, and in particular the mathematical sciences".

In 1994, she won the Distinguished Service Award of the National Association of Mathematicians, and in 2019, she won the Stephens–Shabazz Teaching Award of the same association.
