= Antonin Moine =

French sculptor (1796–1849)

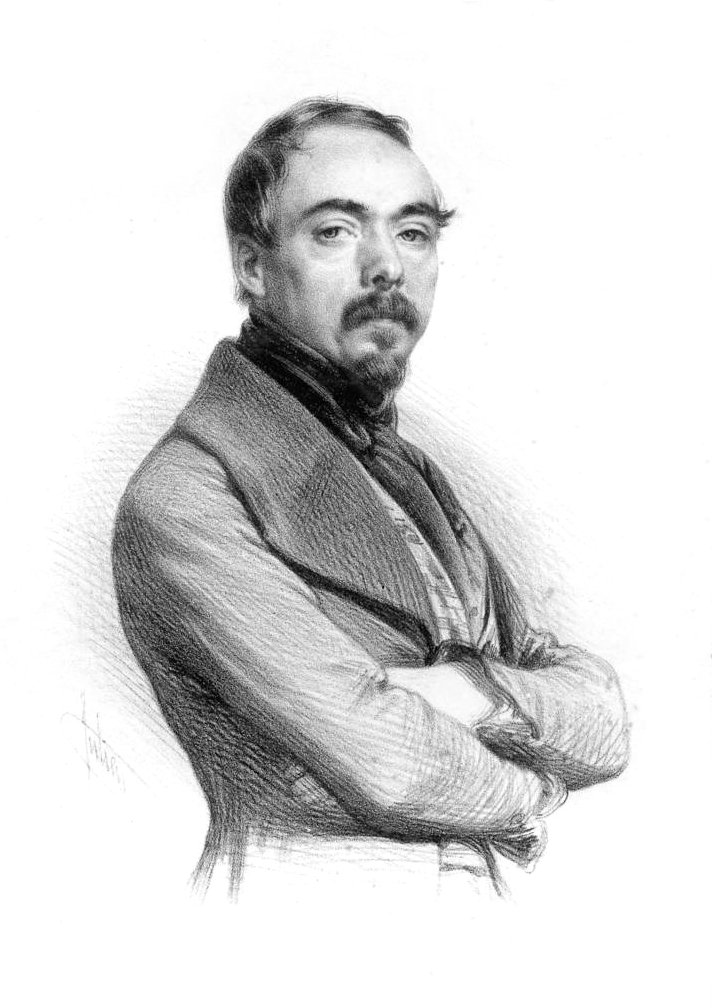
Antonin-Marie Moine

Antonin-Marie Moine (30 June 1796 – 18 March 1849) was a French romantic sculptor in the first half of the 19th century.

== Biography ==
Moine was born in Saint-Étienne.

He began his career as a landscape painter, before becoming a sculptor. He obtained some success exhibiting at the Salon in the early 1830s. From 1835 to 1840, Antonin Moine worked, alongside Louis-Parfait Merlieux and Jean-Jacques Elshoecht (said Carle Elshoecht), on the creation of sculptures commissioned for the Fontaine des Mers and the Fontana dei Quattro Fiumi devoted to the beautification of the Place de la Concorde, as decided by the Mairie de Paris, its owner since 1828. The work was attributed to architect Jacques-Ignace Hittorff.

In 1836, Moine sculpted some of the three Néréides which are on each fountain.

Antonin Moine committed suicide in Paris on 18 March 1849.

== Legacy ==
A square was named after him in Saint-Étienne.

A portrait of Moine by Herminie Déhérain, exhibited at the Paris Salon of 1833, is today in the collection of the musée national des châteaux de Versailles et de Trianon.
