= Herminie Déhérain =

French painter (1798–1839)

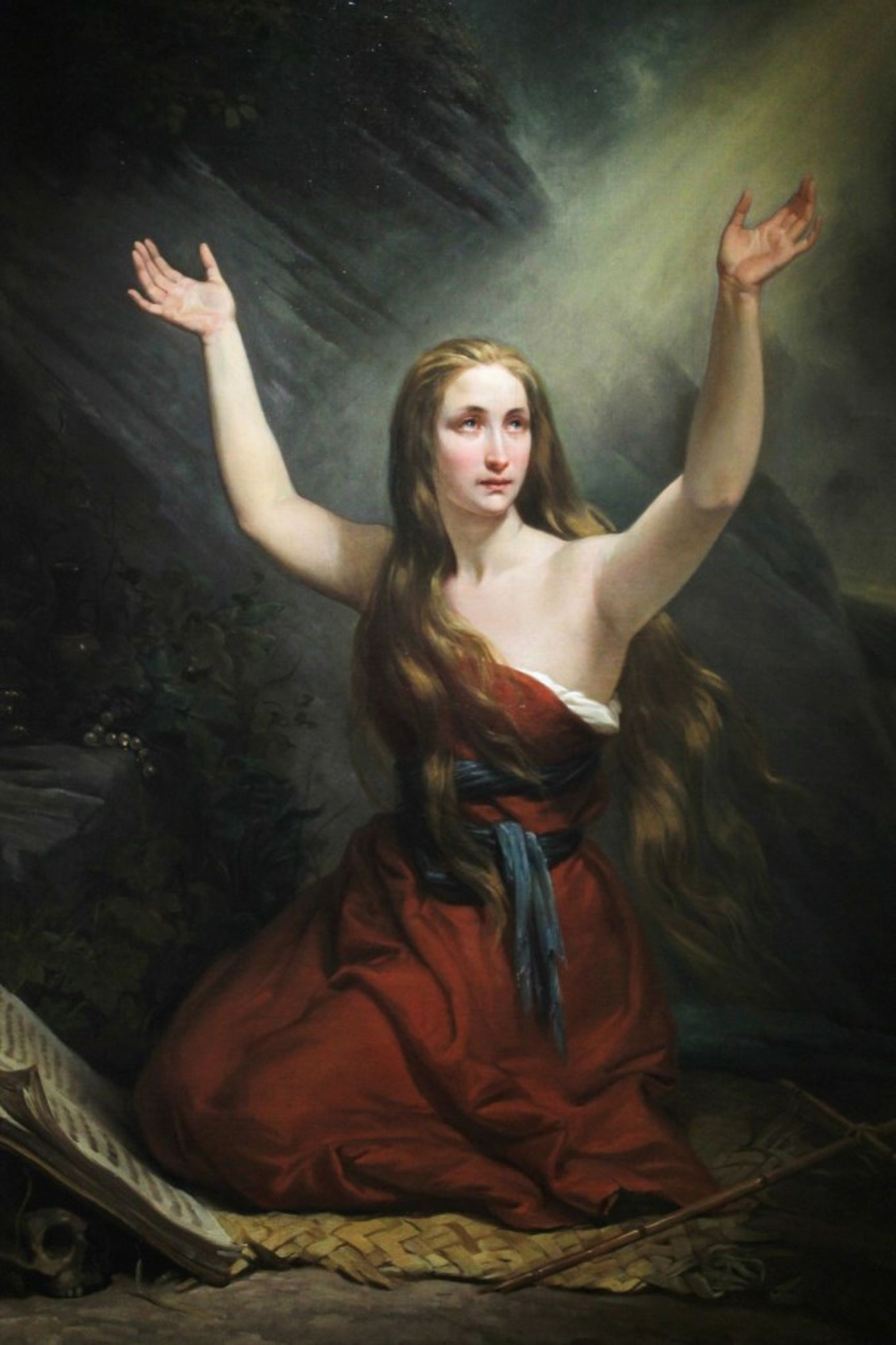
Mary Magdalene in the Desert, 1836

Herminie Déhérain (né Lerminier; 1798–1839) was a French painter.

== Biography ==
Born in Abbeville, Déhérain was a pupil of Hortense Haudebourt-Lescot prior to her marriage to magistrate Alexandre Déhérain. The couple had a son, Pierre, who became a botanist, and a daughter who became a portraitist. Herminie Déhérain exhibited at the Paris Salon beginning in 1827 and continuing until the year of her death; in 1831 she won a second-class medal, and in 1833 she received plaudits from critics for a portrait of Antonin Moine, today owned by the musée national des châteaux de Versailles et de Trianon. She won notice for her religious paintings, too, including a depiction of Christ in the Garden of Olives that today hangs in the Collegiate Church of St. Wolfram at Abbeville, and not long before her death she produced a volume, Pious Images, containing lithographs after her drawings by Pierre Joseph Challemal. Déhérain died in Paris; an obituary notes a collection of unpublished writings, including manuscripts on the role of women in the arts and the beginning of a novel, which was left behind. These items are currently unlocated.

Besides the portrait of Moine, several other works by Déhérain are held in the collection of the musée national des châteaux de Versailles et de Trianon; these include portraits of Charles IV of France, Philip the Bold, and Marie de Bourbon. In addition, a portrait of Louis, comte de Narbonne-Lara is held by the Musée de l'Armée in Paris. A depiction of Genevieve of Brabant is in the Musée Rolin in Autun, and a painting of Faith, Hope, and Charity is held by the museum in the Château de Vitré.
