= Eckart Viehweg =

German mathematician

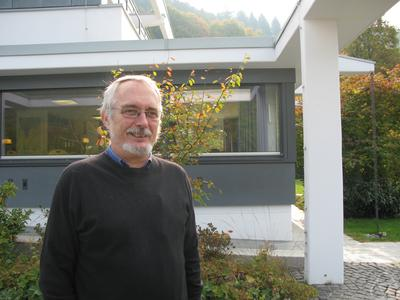
- Viehweg at Oberwolfach, 2009
- Born: 30 December 1948; Zwickau, Soviet occupation zone in Germany
- Died: 29 January 2010 (aged 61); Essen, Germany
- Spouse: Hélène Esnault
- Scientific career
- Fields: Mathematics
- Institutions: University of Duisburg-Essen

Eckart Viehweg (born 30 December 1948 in Zwickau, died 29 January 2010) was a German mathematician. He was a professor of algebraic geometry at the University of Duisburg-Essen.

In 2003 he won the Gottfried Wilhelm Leibniz Prize with his wife, Hélène Esnault.

== See also ==
- Kawamata–Viehweg vanishing theorem
