= Michael Minovitch =

American mathematician

Michael A. Minovitch
- Education: University of California, Berkeley; University of California, Los Angeles
- Known for: Calculating spacecraft trajectories
- Scientific career
- Fields: Mathematics
- Thesis: Mathematical Methods for the Design of Gravity Thrust Space Trajectories (1970)
- Doctoral advisor: Shoshichi Kobayashi

Michael Andrew Minovitch (c. 1936 - 16 September 2022) was an American mathematician who developed gravity assist technique when he was a UCLA graduate student and working summers at NASA's Jet Propulsion Laboratory. He claimed that he invented the technique, even though multiple publications preceded his own. He later sued several people, including Richard Battin who published a paper on gravity assists in 1958, for stealing his ideas, but lost.

In 1961 Minovitch began using the fastest available computer at the time, the IBM 7090, to find solutions of the three-body problem. He ran simulations and developed his own solution by 1962.

The first mission to use a gravity assist was Pioneer 10, which increased its velocity from 52,000 km/h to 132,000 km/h as it passed by Jupiter in December, 1973.

Minovitch patented a vehicle for space travel under the patent title Magnetic propulsion system and operating method, US Patent 6193194 B1.
