= Grauert–Riemenschneider vanishing theorem =

Mathematical theorem

In mathematics, the Grauert–Riemenschneider vanishing theorem is an extension of the Kodaira vanishing theorem on the vanishing of higher cohomology groups of coherent sheaves on a compact complex manifold, due to Grauert and Riemenschneider (1970).

== Grauert–Riemenschneider conjecture ==
The Grauert–Riemenschneider conjecture is a conjecture related to the Grauert–Riemenschneider vanishing theorem:

Grauert & Riemenschneider (1970a); Let M be an n-dimensional compact complex manifold. M is Moishezon if and only if there exists a smooth Hermitian line bundle L over M whose curvature form which is semi-positive everywhere and positive on an open dense set.

This conjecture was proved by Siu (1985) using the Riemann–Roch type theorem (Hirzebruch–Riemann–Roch theorem) and by Demailly (1985) using Morse theory.
