= Marie-Ernestine Serret =

French painter (1812–1884)

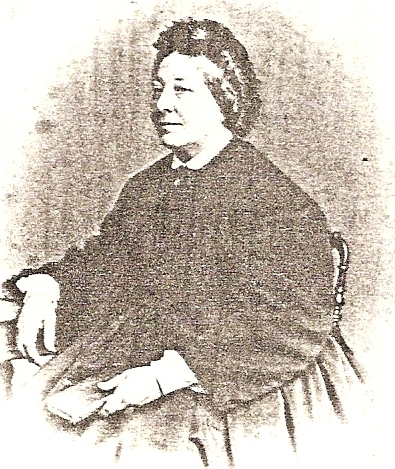
- Portrait of Marie-Ernestine Serret
- Born: 1812
- Died: 1884 (aged 71–72); Paris, France
- Other names: Mme. Cabart or Ernestine Cabart
- Occupation: painter
- Known for: pastels

Marie-Ernestine Serret (1812–1884) was a French painter and pastellist.

Born in Paris, 12 September 1812, she exhibited her work under her maiden name, Serret, although later she did so using her married name, Cabart.

Marie-Ernestine was the sister of mathematician Joseph-Alfred Serret. In 1845, she married Charles-François Cabart, with whom she had three sons including Charles-Maurice Cabart, who became a deputy and then a senator of Manche.

She was a pupil of artist Hortense Haudebourt-Lescot (who was a student of famed portraitist Vigée Le Brun). Serret worked in pastels and oils and her subjects ranged from portraits and still lifes to religious scenes.

Between 1834 and 1849, several of her portraits and studies were shown including Meditation, Jewess, Italian Woman, Carmelite Nun and Christ at the House of Simon. She also participated in the 8th annual exhibition of the Museum of Rouen in 1840.

In 1884, she died in Paris and was buried in the cemetery of La Glacerie in Manche, northwestern France.

== Museum exhibitions ==
She regularly exhibited from 1834 to 1849 using her maiden name "Serret." Her work has appeared in public collections.

In Cherbourg-Octeville:

- St. Clement's Church
- Museum of Thomas Henry: Woman with a blue bow, 1881, pastel

In Paris, Museum of Music: Portrait of Nicolas-Prosper Levasseur (1791-1871), 1839

In Vendôme, the Vendôme Museum:

- Portrait of woman, 1860
- Portrait of woman, 1862

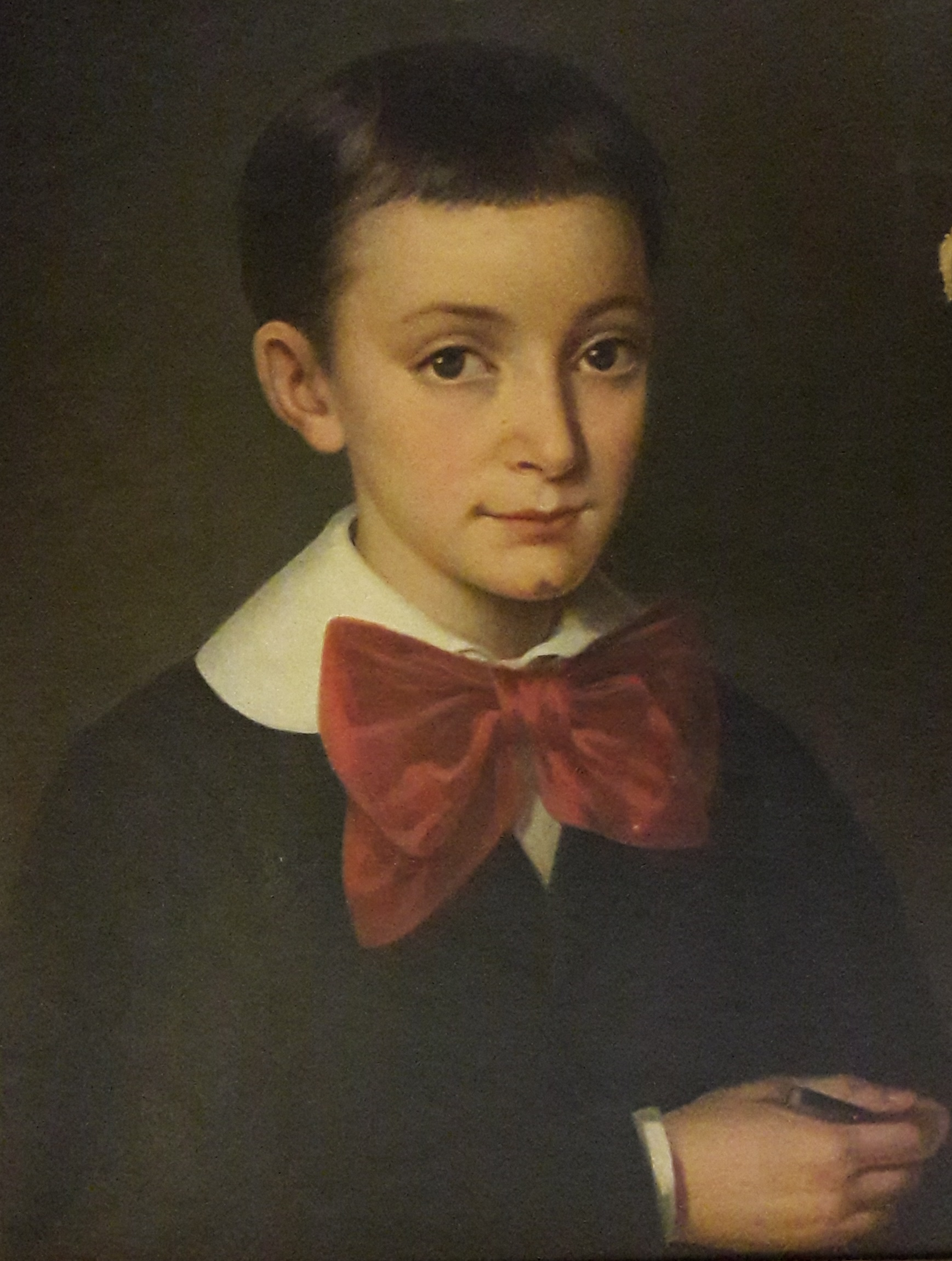
Portrait of Raymond Persin by Ernestine Cabart
