= Advances in Geometry =

- Discipline: Geometry
- Language: English
- Edited by: Theo Grundhöfer, Michael Joswig

Publication details
- History: 2001–present
- Publisher: Walter de Gruyter
- Frequency: Quarterly
- Impact factor: 0.763 (2016)

Standard abbreviations
- ISO 4: Adv. Geom.

Indexing
- CODEN: AGDEA3
- ISSN: 1615-715X (print); 1615-7168 (web)
- LCCN: 2001260062
- OCLC no.: 47204318

Links
- Journal homepage

Advances in Geometry is a peer-reviewed mathematics journal published quarterly by Walter de Gruyter. Founded in 2001, the journal publishes articles on geometry.

The journal is indexed by Mathematical Reviews and Zentralblatt MATH. Its 2016 MCQ was 0.45, and its 2021 impact factor was 0.763.
