= Sandra Di Rocco =

Italian-Swedish mathematician

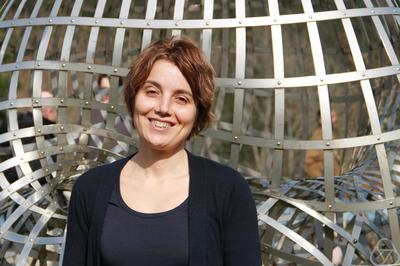
Sandra Di Rocco (2014)

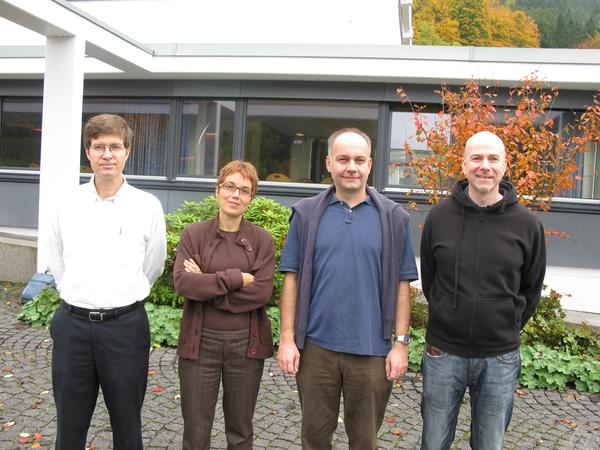
Let to right: Brian Harbourne, Sandra Di Rocco, Tomasz Szemberg, and Thomas Bauer, at the workshop "Linear Series on Algebraic Varieties", Oberwolfach 2010

Sandra Di Rocco (born 1967) is an Italian mathematician specializing in algebraic geometry. She works in Sweden as a professor of mathematics and dean of the faculty of engineering science at KTH Royal Institute of Technology, and chairs the Activity Group on Algebraic Geometry of the Society for Industrial and Applied Mathematics.

== Education ==
Di Rocco earned a laurea from the University of L'Aquila in 1992, and completed her Ph.D. in mathematics in 1996 at University of Notre Dame in the US, supervised by Andrew J. Sommese.

== Career ==
After postdoctoral research at the Mittag-Leffler Institute in Sweden and the Max Planck Institute for Mathematics in Germany, and short stints as an assistant professor at Yale University and the University of Minnesota, Di Rocco became an associate professor at KTH in 2003. She was named full professor in 2010, served as department chair from 2012 to 2019, and became dean in 2020. Di Rocco was elected member of the Royal Swedish Academy of Engineering Sciences in 2021.

== Service ==
Di Rocco was elected as chair of the Activity Group on Algebraic Geometry (SIAG-AG) of the Society for Industrial and Applied Mathematics (SIAM) in 2020.
