= Shoshichi Kobayashi =

Japanese mathematician

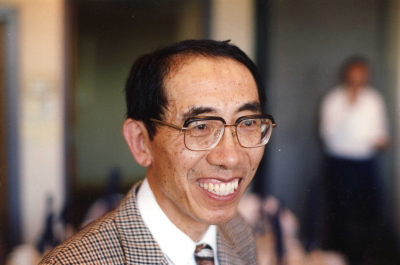
- Shōshichi Kobayashi in Berkeley
- Born: 4 January 1932; Kōfu, Japan
- Died: 29 August 2012 (aged 80); Kofu, Yamanashi, Japan
- Education: University of Tokyo; University of Washington
- Known for: Kobayashi–Hitchin correspondence Kobayashi metric
- Awards: Geometry prize (1987)
- Scientific career
- Fields: Mathematics
- Workplaces: University of California, Berkeley
- Doctoral advisor: Carl B. Allendoerfer
- Doctoral students: Toshiki Mabuchi; Michael Minovitch; Janis Oldham; Burt Totaro

Shoshichi Kobayashi (小林 昭七, Kobayashi Shōshichi; 4 January 1932 – 29 August 2012) was a Japanese mathematician. He was the eldest brother of electrical engineer and computer scientist Hisashi Kobayashi. His research interests were in Riemannian and complex manifolds, transformation groups of geometric structures, and Lie algebras.

== Biography ==
Kobayashi graduated from the University of Tokyo in 1953. In 1956, he earned a Ph.D. from the University of Washington under Carl B. Allendoerfer. His dissertation was Theory of Connections. He then spent two years at the Institute for Advanced Study and two years at MIT. He joined the faculty of the University of California, Berkeley in 1962 as an assistant professor, was awarded tenure the following year, and was promoted to full professor in 1966.

Kobayashi served as chairman of the Berkeley Mathematics Department for a three-year term from 1978 to 1981 and for the 1992 Fall semester. He chose early retirement under the VERIP plan in 1994.

The two-volume book Foundations of Differential Geometry, which he coauthored with Katsumi Nomizu, has been known for its wide influence. In 1970 he was an invited speaker for the section on geometry and topology at the International Congress of Mathematicians in Nice.

== Technical contributions ==
Kobayashi's earliest work dealt with the geometry of connections on principal bundles. Many of these results, along with others, were later absorbed into Foundations of Differential Geometry.

As a consequence of the Gauss–Codazzi equations and the commutation formulas for covariant derivatives, James Simons discovered a formula for the Laplacian of the second fundamental form of a submanifold of a Riemannian manifold. As a consequence, one can find a formula for the Laplacian of the norm-squared of the second fundamental form. This "Simons formula" simplifies significantly when the mean curvature of the submanifold is zero and when the Riemannian manifold has constant curvature. In this setting, Shiing-Shen Chern, Manfredo do Carmo, and Kobayashi studied the algebraic structure of the zeroth-order terms, showing that they are nonnegative provided that the norm of the second fundamental form is sufficiently small.

As a consequence, the case in which the norm of the second fundamental form is constantly equal to the threshold value can be completely analyzed, the key being that all of the matrix inequalities used in controlling the zeroth-order terms become equalities. As such, in this setting, the second fundamental form is uniquely determined. As submanifolds of space forms are locally characterized by their first and second fundamental forms, this results in a complete characterization of minimal submanifolds of the round sphere whose second fundamental form is constant and equal to the threshold value. Chern, do Carmo, and Kobayashi's result was later improved by An-Min Li and Jimin Li, making use of the same methods.

On a Kähler manifold, it is natural to consider the restriction of the sectional curvature to the two-dimensional planes which are holomorphic, i.e. which are invariant under the almost-complex structure. This is called the holomorphic sectional curvature. Samuel Goldberg and Kobayashi introduced an extension of this quantity, called the holomorphic bisectional curvature; its input is a pair of holomorphic two-dimensional planes. Goldberg and Kobayashi established the differential-geometric foundations of this object, carrying out many analogies with the sectional curvature. In particular they established, by the Bochner technique, that the second Betti number of a connected closed manifold must equal one if there is a Kähler metric whose holomorphic bisectional curvature is positive. Later, Kobayashi and Takushiro Ochiai proved some rigidity theorems for Kähler manifolds. In particular, if M is a closed Kähler manifold and there exists α in H^{1, 1}(M, ℤ) such that

$$c_1(M)\geq(n+1)\alpha,$$

then M must be biholomorphic to complex projective space. This, in combination with the Goldberg–Kobayashi result, forms the final part of Yum-Tong Siu and Shing-Tung Yau's proof of the Frankel conjecture. Kobayashi and Ochiai also characterized the situation of c_{1}(M) = nα as M being biholomorphic to a quadratic hypersurface of complex projective space.

Kobayashi is also notable for having proved that a hermitian–Einstein metric on a holomorphic vector bundle over a compact Kähler manifold has deep algebro-geometric implications, as it implies semistability and decomposability as a direct sum of stable bundles. This establishes one direction of the Kobayashi–Hitchin correspondence. Karen Uhlenbeck and Yau proved the converse result, following well-known partial results by Simon Donaldson.

In the 1960s, Kobayashi introduced what is now known as the Kobayashi metric. This associates a pseudo-metric to any complex manifold, in a holomorphically invariant way. This sets up the important notion of Kobayashi hyperbolicity, which is defined by the condition that the Kobayashi metric is a genuine metric (and not only a pseudo-metric). With these notions, Kobayashi was able to establish a higher-dimensional version of the Alhfors–Schwarz lemma from complex analysis.

== Major publications ==
Articles

- Kobayashi, Shoshichi (1959). "Geometry of bounded domains". Transactions of the American Mathematical Society. 92 (2): 267–290. doi:10.1090/S0002-9947-1959-0112162-5. MR 0112162. Zbl 0136.07102.
- Goldberg, Samuel I.; Kobayashi, Shoshichi (1967). "Holomorphic bisectional curvature". Journal of Differential Geometry. 1 (3–4): 225–233. doi:10.4310/jdg/1214428090. MR 0227901. Zbl 0169.53202.
- Chern, S. S.; do Carmo, M.; Kobayashi, S. (1970). "Minimal submanifolds of a sphere with second fundamental form of constant length". In Browder, Felix E. (ed.). Functional Analysis and Related Fields. Conference in honor of Professor Marshall Stone, held at the University of Chicago (May 1968). New York: Springer. pp. 59–75. doi:10.1007/978-3-642-48272-4_2. ISBN 978-3-642-48274-8. MR 0273546. Zbl 0216.44001.
- Kobayashi, Shoshichi; Ochiai, Takushiro (1973). "Characterizations of complex projective spaces and hyperquadrics". Journal of Mathematics of Kyoto University. 13 (1): 31–47. doi:10.1215/kjm/1250523432. MR 0316745. Zbl 0261.32013.
- Kobayashi, Shoshichi (1976). "Intrinsic distances, measures and geometric function theory" (PDF). Bulletin of the American Mathematical Society. 82 (3): 357–416. doi:10.1090/S0002-9904-1976-14018-9. MR 0414940. Zbl 0346.32031.

Books

- Kobayashi, Shoshichi; Nomizu, Katsumi (1996) [1963]. Foundations of differential geometry. Vol I. Interscience Tracts in Pure and Applied Mathematics. Vol. 15. New York–London: John Wiley & Sons, Inc. ISBN 0-471-15733-3. MR 0152974. Zbl 0119.37502.
- Kobayashi, Shoshichi; Nomizu, Katsumi (1969). Foundations of differential geometry. Vol II. Interscience Tracts in Pure and Applied Mathematics. Vol. 15. Reprinted in 1996. New York–London: John Wiley & Sons, Inc. ISBN 0-471-15732-5. MR 0238225. Zbl 0175.48504.
- Kobayashi, Shoshichi (1972). Transformation groups in differential geometry. Ergebnisse der Mathematik und ihrer Grenzgebiete. Vol. 70. New York–Heidelberg: Springer-Verlag. ISBN 0-387-05848-6. MR 0355886. Zbl 0246.53031.
- Kobayashi, Shoshichi (1984). An introduction to the theory of connections. Seminar on Mathematical Sciences. Vol. 8. Notes by Kotaro Yamada. Yokohama: Keio University, Department of Mathematics. MR 0856760. Zbl 0547.53018.
- Kobayashi, Shoshichi (1987). Differential geometry of complex vector bundles. Publications of the Mathematical Society of Japan. Vol. 15. Reprinted in 2014. Princeton, NJ: Princeton University Press. ISBN 0-691-08467-X. MR 0909698. Zbl 0708.53002.
- Kobayashi, Shoshichi (1998). Hyperbolic complex spaces. Grundlehren der mathematischen Wissenschaften. Vol. 318. Berlin: Springer-Verlag. ISBN 3-540-63534-3. MR 1635983. Zbl 0917.32019.
- Kobayashi, Shoshichi (2005). Hyperbolic manifolds and holomorphic mappings. An introduction (Second edition of 1970 original ed.). Hackensack, NJ: World Scientific Publishing Co. Pte. Ltd. ISBN 981-256-496-9. MR 2194466. Zbl 1084.32018.
- Kobayashi, Shoshichi (2019). Differential geometry of curves and surfaces. Springer Undergraduate Mathematics Series. Translated by Nagmo, Eriko Shinozaki; Tanaka, Makiki Sumi (Revised edition of 1977 original ed.). Singapore: Springer. doi:10.1007/978-981-15-1739-6. ISBN 978-981-15-1738-9. S2CID 210246198. Zbl 1437.53001.

Kobayashi was also the author of several textbooks which (as of 2022) have only been published in Japanese.
