= Complex vector bundle =

In mathematics, a complex vector bundle is a vector bundle whose fibers are complex vector spaces.

Any complex vector bundle can be viewed as a real vector bundle through the restriction of scalars. Conversely, any real vector bundle $E$ can be promoted to a complex vector bundle, the complexification

$$E \otimes \mathbb{C} ;$$

whose fibers are $E_x\otimes_\R \C$.

Any complex vector bundle over a paracompact space admits a hermitian metric.

The basic invariant of a complex vector bundle is a Chern class. A complex vector bundle is canonically oriented; in particular, one can take its Euler class.

A complex vector bundle is a holomorphic vector bundle if $X$ is a complex manifold and if the local trivializations are biholomorphic.

== Complex structure ==
A complex vector bundle can be thought of as a real vector bundle with an additional structure, the complex structure. By definition, a complex structure is a bundle map between a real vector bundle $E$ and itself:

$$J: E \to E$$

such that $J$ acts as the square root $\mathrm i$ of $-1$ on fibers: if $J_x: E_x \to E_x$ is the map on fiber-level, then $J_x^2 = -1$ as a linear map. If $E$ is a complex vector bundle, then the complex structure $J$ can be defined by setting $J_x$ to be the scalar multiplication by $\mathrm i$. Conversely, if $E$ is a real vector bundle with a complex structure $J$, then $E$ can be turned into a complex vector bundle by setting: for any real numbers $a$, $b$ and a real vector $v$ in a fiber $E_x$,

$$(a + \mathrm ib) v = a v + J(b v).$$

Example: A complex structure on the tangent bundle of a real manifold $M$ is usually called an almost complex structure. A theorem of Newlander and Nirenberg says that an almost complex structure $J$ is "integrable" in the sense it is induced by a structure of a complex manifold if and only if a certain tensor involving $J$ vanishes.

== Conjugate bundle ==
If E is a complex vector bundle, then the conjugate bundle $\overline{E}$ of E is obtained by having complex numbers acting through the complex conjugates of the numbers. Thus, the identity map of the underlying real vector bundles: $E_{\mathbb{R}} \to \overline{E}_\mathbb{R} = E_{\mathbb{R}}$ is conjugate-linear, and E and its conjugate E̅ are isomorphic as real vector bundles.

The k-th Chern class of $\overline{E}$ is given by

$$c_k(\overline{E}) = (-1)^k c_k(E)$$.

In particular, E and E̅ are not isomorphic in general.

If E has a hermitian metric, then the conjugate bundle E̅ is isomorphic to the dual bundle $E^* = \operatorname{Hom}(E, \mathcal{O})$ through the metric, where we wrote $\mathcal{O}$ for the trivial complex line bundle.

If E is a real vector bundle, then the underlying real vector bundle of the complexification of E is a direct sum of two copies of E:

$$(E \otimes \mathbb{C})_{\mathbb{R}} =  E \oplus E$$

(since V⊗_{R}C = V⊕i‌V for any real vector space V.) If a complex vector bundle E is the complexification of a real vector bundle E', then E' is called a real form of E (there may be more than one real form) and E is said to be defined over the real numbers. If E has a real form, then E is isomorphic to its conjugate (since they are both sum of two copies of a real form), and consequently the odd Chern classes of E have order 2.

== See also ==
- Holomorphic vector bundle
- K-theory
