= Nakano vanishing theorem =

Generalizes the Kodaira vanishing theorem

In mathematics, specifically in the study of vector bundles over complex Kähler manifolds, the Nakano vanishing theorem, sometimes called the Akizuki–Nakano vanishing theorem, generalizes the Kodaira vanishing theorem. Given a compact complex manifold M with a holomorphic line bundle F over M, the Nakano vanishing theorem provides a condition on when the cohomology groups $H^q(M; \Omega^p(F))$ equal zero. Here, $\Omega^p(F)$ denotes the sheaf of holomorphic (p,0)-forms taking values on F. The theorem states that, if the first Chern class of F is negative,
$$H^q(M; \Omega^p(F)) = 0 \text{ when } q + p < n.$$
Alternatively, if the first Chern class of F is positive,
$$H^q(M; \Omega^p(F)) = 0 \text{ when } q + p > n.$$

== See also ==
- Le Potier's vanishing theorem
