= Algebraic manifold =

Algebraic variety

In mathematics, an algebraic manifold is an algebraic variety which is also a manifold. As such, algebraic manifolds are a generalisation of the concept of smooth curves and surfaces defined by polynomials. An example is the sphere, which can be defined as the zero set of the polynomial x^{2} + y^{2} + z^{2} – 1, and hence is an algebraic variety.

For an algebraic manifold, the ground field will be the real numbers or complex numbers; in the case of the real numbers, the manifold of real points is sometimes called a Nash manifold.

Every sufficiently small local patch of an algebraic manifold is isomorphic to k^{m} where k is the ground field. Equivalently the variety is smooth (free from singular points). The Riemann sphere is one example of a complex algebraic manifold, since it is the complex projective line.

== Examples ==
- Compact Riemann surfaces
  - Riemann sphere
  - Elliptic curves
- Grassmannian

== See also ==
- Algebraic geometry and analytic geometry
