= Katsumi Nomizu =

Japanese American mathematician (1924 to 2008)

- Born: December 1, 1924; Osaka, Japan
- Died: November 5, 2008 (aged 83); Providence, Rhode Island
- Education: Osaka University
- Known for: Kulkarni-Nomizu product Foundations of Differential Geometry
- Scientific career
- Fields: Mathematics
- Doctoral advisor: Shiing-Shen Chern

Katsumi Nomizu (野水 克己, Nomizu Katsumi; December 1, 1924 – November 5, 2008) was a Japanese-American mathematician known for his work in differential geometry.

== Life and career ==
Nomizu was born in Osaka, Japan on December 1, 1924. He studied mathematics at Osaka University, graduating in 1947 with a Master of Science then traveled to the United States on a U.S. Army Fulbright Scholarship. He studied first at Columbia University and then at the University of Chicago where in 1953 he became the first student to earn a Ph.D. under the thesis direction of Shiing-Shen Chern. The subject was affine differential geometry, a topic to which he would return much later in his career. He presented his thesis, Invariant affine connections on homogeneous spaces in 1953.

Returning to Japan, he studied at Nagoya University, obtaining a doctor of science in 1955. He published his first volume, Lie Groups and Differential Geometry dedicated to his wife Kimiko whom he had married that same year. Nomizu taught at Nagoya University until 1958 when he accepted a position at Catholic University in Washington D.C. His first Ph.D. student there was Fr. Andrew Whitman, SJ, founder of the Clavius Research Group, who maintained a close relationship with his advisor over the years.

In 1960 he began his thirty-five-year career with Brown University, first as associate professor, then becoming full professor in 1963. During this time he embarked on a major collaborative project with Shoshichi Kobayashi at the University of California, Berkeley, resulting in the classic two-volume work, Foundations of Differential Geometry in 1963. A second volume completed the project in 1969. A mark of the style of these two mathematicians is that in the more than 700 pages in this work on geometry, there is not a single diagram or picture.

Nomizu was well known for his devotion to meticulous exposition in a very formal style and to high-quality teaching at the undergraduate level. His 1966 text, Fundamentals of Linear Algebra includes these words in the dedication, "It is my hope that this book will continue to serve those students of mathematics and science for whom a more than rudimentary background in linear algebra is an indispensable part of their training." When the book came out in a new edition in 1979, Nomizu specifically acknowledged help from a student, Marty Magid, who started as a freshman at Brown in his linear algebra class and ended up writing a Ph.D. thesis under his direction in 1978.

Over the course of his career, Nomizu was influential in determining the course of differential geometry by stressing what he called the structural approach. In 1965, he edited the Proceedings of a United States-Japan Seminar in Differential Geometry that he helped to organize for the National Science Foundation. He was invited to visiting positions in Berlin, Bonn, Strasbourg, and Rio de Janeiro. Among his nearly one hundred papers and articles and seven books, he had twenty-three co-authors from Belgium, Brazil, China, Germany, Italy, Japan, Poland, Yugoslavia and the U.S.

In his teaching career he helped 13 students from Brown and 1 from MIT obtain a Ph.D. According to the Mathematics Genealogy Project, Nomizu has seventeen mathematical grandchildren. On the occasion of his seventieth birthday in 1994, a large group of students, co-authors and colleagues gathered for a six-day celebration co-sponsored by the Catholic Universities of Brussels and Leuven, leading to a Festschrift in his honor containing 62 papers with authors from 18 countries. Also in 1994 his final book was published: Affine Differential Geometry, co-authored with Takeshi Sasaki.

Nomizu retired from Brown University in 1995 as the Florence Pierce Grant University Professor. He served as editor of a collection of papers on number theory and algebraic geometry published by the American Mathematical Society in 1996. He received international awards from Germany, Japan and Italy for his writing and leadership.

Nomizu died on November 5, 2008, in Providence, Rhode Island. He is survived by his wife Kimiko and his four children: Naomi, Yvonne, Simone and Raymond and now ten familial grandchildren. In his obituary his family noted that he was known for his "fierce intellect, wry humor, and gentle soul".

== Awards ==
- 1991 Humboldt Prize
- 1994 Honorary Socio Corrispondanti, Accademia Peloriana dei Pericolanti, Messina, Italy
- 1997 Wilhelm Blaschke Medal
