= Foundations of Differential Geometry =

Introduction and Reference on Differential Geometry

- First edition
- Author: Shoshichi Kobayashi; Katsumi Nomizu
- Language: English
- Series: Interscience Tracts in Pure and Applied Mathematics
- Subject: Differential Geometry
- Genre: Textbook
- Publisher: Interscience Publishers
- Publication date: 1963 (Vol I), 1969 (Vol II)
- Pages: 329 (Vol I), 470 (Vol II)

Foundations of Differential Geometry is an influential 2-volume mathematics book on differential geometry written by Shoshichi Kobayashi and Katsumi Nomizu. The first volume was published in 1963 and the second in 1969, by Interscience Publishers. Both were published again in 1996 as Wiley Classics Library.

The first volume considers manifolds, fiber bundles, tensor analysis, connections in bundles, and the role of Lie groups. It also covers holonomy, the de Rham decomposition theorem and the Hopf–Rinow theorem. According to the review of James Eells, it has a "fine expositional style" and consists of a "special blend of algebraic, analytic, and geometric concepts". Eells says it is "essentially a textbook (even though there are no exercises)". An advanced text, it has a "pace geared to a [one] term graduate course".

The second volume considers submanifolds of Riemannian manifolds, the Gauss map, and the second fundamental form. It continues with geodesics on Riemannian manifolds, Jacobi fields, the Morse index, the Rauch comparison theorems, and the Cartan–Hadamard theorem. Then it ascends to complex manifolds, Kähler manifolds, homogeneous spaces, and symmetric spaces. In a discussion of curvature representation of characteristic classes of principal bundles (Chern–Weil theory), it covers Euler classes, Chern classes, and Pontryagin classes. The second volume also received a favorable review by J. Eells in Mathematical Reviews.

== Reception ==
These books have received multiple reviews throughout which three themes repeatedly occur.

- It is the definitive book. Reviews say it is considered to be "THE standard reference work of the subject" and likely to "become the standard reference for this generation. A complete treatment of the foundations, and the definitive exposition of the principal bundle point of view." Also described as having "complete and well organized proofs of the numerous 'folk theorems,' the systematic and well thought out treatment of the theory of connections in principal fibre bundles, and the closing notes giving a skillful survey of the wide horizons." A review of Volume II says "The book contains much material not otherwise available in book form and sometimes not easily accessible."
- It is weak on geometric intuition. Reviews describe it as having "austere abstraction", and some of the chapters are said "to be part of a conspiracy to blindfold [the readers] geometric vision." Another reviewer says "not the slightest attempt is made to present to the modern reader the marvelous geometric insights into Riemannian geometry pioneered by Cartan".
- It is not suitable as an introduction. Reviews say it has "no exercises, almost no examples". Also that "the reader is expected to come equipped with some earlier familiarity" with differential geometry and "The first chapter is a very sketchy introduction to the background material in manifolds, tensors, Lie groups, Lie algebras, and fiber bundles.". One reviewer says "anyone who thrusts these two volumes on a beginner for use as an introductory text would be guilty of committing an act of inhumanity against a fellow being."
