= Holomorphic vector bundle =

Complex vector bundle on a complex manifold

In mathematics, a holomorphic vector bundle is a complex vector bundle over a complex manifold X such that the total space E is a complex manifold and the projection map π : E → X is holomorphic. Fundamental examples are the holomorphic tangent bundle of a complex manifold, and its dual, the holomorphic cotangent bundle. A holomorphic line bundle is a rank one holomorphic vector bundle.

By Serre's GAGA, the category of holomorphic vector bundles on a smooth complex projective variety X (viewed as a complex manifold) is equivalent to the category of algebraic vector bundles (i.e., locally free sheaves of finite rank) on X.

== Definition through trivialization ==
Specifically, one requires that the trivialization maps

$$\phi_U :  \pi^{-1}(U) \to U \times \mathbf{C}^k$$

are biholomorphic maps. This is equivalent to requiring that the transition functions

$$t_{UV} : U\cap V \to \mathrm{GL}_k(\mathbf{C})$$

are holomorphic maps. The holomorphic structure on the tangent bundle of a complex manifold is guaranteed by the remark that the derivative (in the appropriate sense) of a vector-valued holomorphic function is itself holomorphic.

== The sheaf of holomorphic sections ==
Let E be a holomorphic vector bundle. A local section s : U → E|_{U} is said to be holomorphic if, in a neighborhood of each point of U, it is holomorphic in some (equivalently any) trivialization.

This condition is local, meaning that holomorphic sections form a sheaf on X. This sheaf is sometimes denoted $\mathcal O(E)$, or abusively by E. Such a sheaf is always locally free and of the same rank as the rank of the vector bundle. If E is the trivial line bundle $\underline{\mathbf{C}},$ then this sheaf coincides with the structure sheaf $\mathcal O_X$ of the complex manifold X.

== Basic examples ==
There are line bundles $\mathcal{O}(k)$ over $\mathbb{CP}^n$ whose global sections correspond to homogeneous polynomials of degree $k$ (for $k$ a positive integer). In particular, $k = 0$ corresponds to the trivial line bundle. If we take the covering by the open sets $U_i = \{ [x_0:\cdots:x_n] : x_i \neq 0 \}$ then we can find charts $\phi_i: U_i \to \mathbb{C}^n$ defined by

$\phi_i([x_0:\cdots:x_i: \cdots : x_n]) = \left( \frac{x_0}{x_i},\ldots,\frac{x_{i-1}}{x_i}, \frac{x_{i+1}}{x_i}, \ldots, \frac{x_n}{x_i} \right) = \mathbb{C}^n_i$

We can construct transition functions $\phi_{ij}|_{U_i\cap U_j}:\mathbb{C}_i^n \cap \phi_i(U_i\cap U_j) \to \mathbb{C}_j^n \cap \phi_j(U_i\cap U_j)$ defined by

$\phi_{ij} = \phi_i \circ \phi_j^{-1}(z_1, \ldots, z_n) = \left( \frac{z_1}{z_i},\ldots, \frac{z_{i-1}}{z_i}, \frac{z_{i+1}}{z_i}, \ldots, \frac{z_j}{z_i},\frac{1}{z_i},\frac{z_{j+1}}{z_i},\ldots, \frac{z_n}{z_i} \right)$

Now, if we consider the trivial bundle $L_i = \phi_i(U_i)\times \mathbb{C}$ we can form induced transition functions $\psi_{i,j}$. If we use the coordinate $z$ on the fiber, then we can form transition functions

$\psi_{i,j}((z_1,\ldots,z_n), z) = \left(\phi_{i,j}(z_1,\ldots,z_n), \frac{z_i^k}{z_j^k}\cdot z \right)$

for any integer $k$. Each of these are associated with a line bundle $\mathcal{O}(k)$. Since vector bundles necessarily pull back, any holomorphic submanifold $f:X \to \mathbb{CP}^n$ has an associated line bundle $f^*(\mathcal{O}(k))$, sometimes denoted $\mathcal{O}(k)|_X$.

== Dolbeault operators ==
Suppose E is a holomorphic vector bundle. Then there is a distinguished operator $\bar{\partial}_E$ defined as follows. In a local trivialisation $U_{\alpha}$ of E, with local frame $e_1,\dots,e_n$, any section may be written $s=\sum_i s^i e_i$ for some smooth functions $s^i : U_{\alpha} \to \mathbb{C}$. Define an operator locally by

$$\bar{\partial}_E (s) := \sum_i \bar{\partial}(s^i) \otimes e_i$$

where $\bar{\partial}$ is the regular Cauchy–Riemann operator of the base manifold. This operator is well-defined on all of E because on an overlap of two trivialisations $U_{\alpha}, U_{\beta}$ with holomorphic transition function $g_{\alpha\beta}$, if $s=s^i e_i = \tilde{s}^j f_j$ where $f_j$ is a local frame for E on $U_{\beta}$, then $s^i = \sum_j (g_{\alpha\beta})_j^i \tilde{s}^j$, and so

$$\bar{\partial} (s^i) = \sum_j (g_{\alpha\beta})_j^i \bar{\partial} (\tilde{s}^j)$$

because the transition functions are holomorphic. This leads to the following definition: A Dolbeault operator on a smooth complex vector bundle $E\to M$ is a $\mathbb{C}$-linear operator

$$\bar{\partial}_E : \Gamma(E) \to \Omega^{0,1}(M)\otimes \Gamma(E)$$

such that

- (Cauchy–Riemann condition) $\bar{\partial}_E^2 = 0$,
- (Leibniz rule) For any section $s\in \Gamma(E)$ and function $f$ on $M$, one has

$$\bar{\partial}_E (fs) = \bar{\partial}(f) \otimes s + f \bar{\partial}_E (s)$$.

By an application of the Newlander–Nirenberg theorem, one obtains a converse to the construction of the Dolbeault operator of a holomorphic bundle:

Theorem: Given a Dolbeault operator $\bar{\partial}_E$ on a smooth complex vector bundle $E$, there is a unique holomorphic structure on $E$ such that $\bar{\partial}_E$ is the associated Dolbeault operator as constructed above.

With respect to the holomorphic structure induced by a Dolbeault operator $\bar{\partial}_E$, a smooth section $s\in \Gamma(E)$ is holomorphic if and only if $\bar{\partial}_E(s) = 0$. This is similar morally to the definition of a smooth or complex manifold as a ringed space. Namely, it is enough to specify which functions on a topological manifold are smooth or complex, in order to imbue it with a smooth or complex structure.

Dolbeault operator has local inverse in terms of homotopy operator.

== The sheaves of forms with values in a holomorphic vector bundle ==
If $\mathcal E_X^{p, q}$ denotes the sheaf of C^{∞} differential forms of type (p, q), then the sheaf of type (p, q) forms with values in E can be defined as the tensor product

$$\mathcal{E}^{p, q}(E) \triangleq \mathcal E_X^{p, q}\otimes E.$$

These sheaves are fine, meaning that they admit partitions of unity. A fundamental distinction between smooth and holomorphic vector bundles is that in the latter, there is a canonical differential operator, given by the Dolbeault operator defined above:

$$\overline{\partial}_E : \mathcal{E}^{p, q}(E) \to \mathcal{E}^{p, q+1}(E).$$

== Cohomology of holomorphic vector bundles ==
If E is a holomorphic vector bundle, the cohomology of E is defined to be the sheaf cohomology of $\mathcal O(E)$. In particular, we have

$$H^0(X, \mathcal O(E)) = \Gamma (X, \mathcal O(E)),$$

the space of global holomorphic sections of E. We also have that $H^1(X, \mathcal O(E))$ parametrizes the group of extensions of the trivial line bundle of X by E, that is, exact sequences of holomorphic vector bundles 0 → E → F → X × C → 0. For the group structure, see also Baer sum as well as sheaf extension.

By Dolbeault's theorem, this sheaf cohomology can alternatively be described as the cohomology of the chain complex defined by the sheaves of forms with values in the holomorphic bundle $E$. Namely we have

$$H^i(X, \mathcal O(E)) = H^i((\mathcal{E}^{0,\bullet}(E), \bar{\partial}_E)).$$

== The Picard group ==
In the context of complex differential geometry, the Picard group Pic(X) of the complex manifold X is the group of isomorphism classes of holomorphic line bundles with group law given by tensor product and inversion given by dualization. It can be equivalently defined as the first cohomology group $H^1(X, \mathcal O_X^*)$ of the sheaf of non-vanishing holomorphic functions.

== Hermitian metrics on a holomorphic vector bundle ==
Let E be a holomorphic vector bundle on a complex manifold M and suppose there is a hermitian metric on E; that is, fibers E_{x} are equipped with inner products <·,·> that vary smoothly. Then there exists a unique connection ∇ on E that is compatible with both complex structure and metric structure, called the Chern connection; that is, ∇ is a connection such that

(1) For any smooth sections s of E, $\pi_{0,1} \nabla s = \bar \partial_E s$ where π_{0,1} takes the (0, 1)-component of an E-valued 1-form.
(2) For any smooth sections s, t of E and a vector field X on M,

$$X \cdot \langle s, t \rangle = \langle \nabla_X s, t \rangle + \langle s, \nabla_X t \rangle$$

where we wrote $\nabla_X s$ for the contraction of $\nabla s$ by X. (This is equivalent to saying that the parallel transport by ∇ preserves the metric <·,·>.)

Indeed, if u = (e_{1}, …, e_{n}) is a holomorphic frame, then let $h_{ij} = \langle e_i, e_j \rangle$ and define ω_{u} by the equation $\sum h_{ik} \, {(\omega_u)}^k_{j} = \partial h_{ij}$, which we write more simply as:

$$\omega_u = h^{-1} \partial h.$$

If u' = ug is another frame with a holomorphic change of basis g, then

$$\omega_{u'} = g^{-1} dg + g \omega_u g^{-1},$$

and so ω is indeed a connection form, giving rise to ∇ by ∇s = ds + ω · s. Now, since ${\overline{\omega}}^T = \overline{\partial} h \cdot h^{-1}$,

$$d \langle e_i, e_j \rangle = \partial h_{ij} + \overline{\partial} h_{ij} = \langle {\omega}^k_i e_k, e_j \rangle + \langle e_i, {\omega}^k_j e_k \rangle = \langle \nabla e_i, e_j \rangle + \langle e_i, \nabla e_j \rangle.$$

That is, ∇ is compatible with metric structure. Finally, since ω is a (1, 0)-form, the (0, 1)-component of $\nabla s$ is $\bar \partial_E s$.

Let $\Omega = d \omega + \omega \wedge \omega$ be the curvature form of ∇. Since $\pi_{0,1} \nabla = \bar \partial_E$ squares to zero by the definition of a Dolbeault operator, Ω has no (0, 2)-component and since Ω is easily shown to be skew-hermitian, it also has no (2, 0)-component. Consequently, Ω is a (1, 1)-form given by

$\Omega = \bar \partial_E \omega.$

The curvature Ω appears prominently in the vanishing theorems for higher cohomology of holomorphic vector bundles; e.g., Kodaira's vanishing theorem and Nakano's vanishing theorem.

== See also ==
- Birkhoff–Grothendieck theorem
- Quillen metric
- Serre duality
