= Kodaira vanishing theorem =

Gives general conditions under which sheaf cohomology groups with indices > 0 are zero

In mathematics, the Kodaira vanishing theorem is a basic result of complex manifold theory and complex algebraic geometry, describing general conditions under which sheaf cohomology groups with indices q > 0 are automatically zero. The implications for the group with index q = 0 is usually that its dimension — the number of independent global sections — coincides with a holomorphic Euler characteristic that can be computed using the Hirzebruch–Riemann–Roch theorem.

== The complex analytic case ==
The statement of Kunihiko Kodaira's result is that if M is a compact Kähler manifold of complex dimension n, L any holomorphic line bundle on M that is positive, and K_{M} is the canonical line bundle, then

$$H^q(M, K_M\otimes L) = 0$$

for q > 0. Here $K_M\otimes L$ stands for the tensor product of line bundles. By means of Serre duality, one also obtains the vanishing of $H^q(M, L^{\otimes-1})$ for q < n. There is a generalisation, the Kodaira–Nakano vanishing theorem, in which $K_M\otimes L\cong\Omega^n(L)$, where Ω^{n}(L) denotes the sheaf of holomorphic (n,0)-forms on M with values on L, is replaced by Ω^{r}(L), the sheaf of holomorphic (r,0)-forms with values on L. Then the cohomology group H^{q}(M, Ω^{r}(L)) vanishes whenever q + r > n.

== The algebraic case ==
The Kodaira vanishing theorem can be formulated within the language of algebraic geometry without any reference to transcendental methods such as Kähler metrics. Positivity of the line bundle L translates into the corresponding invertible sheaf being ample (i.e., some tensor power gives a projective embedding). The algebraic Kodaira–Akizuki–Nakano vanishing theorem is the following statement:

If k is a field of characteristic zero, X is a smooth and projective k-scheme of dimension d, and L is an ample invertible sheaf on X, then

$$H^q(X,L\otimes\Omega^p_{X/k}) = 0 \text{ for } p+q>d,$$

where Ω^{p} denotes the sheaf of relative (algebraic) differential forms (see Kähler differential).

Raynaud (1978) showed that this result does not always hold over fields of characteristic p > 0, and in particular fails for Raynaud surfaces. Later Sommese (1986) give a counterexample for singular varieties with non-log canonical singularities, and also,Lauritzen & Rao (1997) gave elementary counterexamples inspired by proper homogeneous spaces with non-reduced stabilizers.

Until 1987 the only known proof in characteristic zero was however based on the complex analytic proof and the GAGA comparison theorems. However, in 1987 Pierre Deligne and Luc Illusie gave a purely algebraic proof of the vanishing theorem in (Deligne & Illusie 1987). Their proof is based on showing that the Hodge–de Rham spectral sequence for algebraic de Rham cohomology degenerates in degree 1. This is shown by lifting a corresponding more specific result from characteristic p > 0 — the positive-characteristic result does not hold without limitations but can be lifted to provide the full result.

== Consequences and applications ==
Historically, the Kodaira embedding theorem was derived with the help of the vanishing theorem. With application of Serre duality, the vanishing of various sheaf cohomology groups (usually related to the canonical line bundle) of curves and surfaces help with the classification of complex manifolds, e.g. Enriques–Kodaira classification.

== See also ==
- Kawamata–Viehweg vanishing theorem
- Mumford vanishing theorem
- Ramanujam vanishing theorem
