= Kawamata–Viehweg vanishing theorem =

In algebraic geometry, the Kawamata–Viehweg vanishing theorem is an extension of the Kodaira vanishing theorem, on the vanishing of coherent cohomology groups, to logarithmic pairs, proved independently by Viehweg and Kawamata in 1982.

The theorem states that if L is a big nef line bundle (for example, an ample line bundle) on a complex projective manifold with canonical line bundle K, then the coherent cohomology groups H^{i}(L⊗K) vanish for all positive i.
