= Gábor Székelyhidi =

Hungarian mathematician

Gábor Székelyhidi (born 30 June 1981 in Debrecen) is a Hungarian mathematician, specializing in differential geometry.

Gábor Székelyhidi, the brother of László Székelyhidi, graduated from Trinity College, Cambridge with a bachelor's degree in 2002 (part 3 of Tripos 2003 with honours) and received from Imperial College London his PhD in 2006 under the supervision of Simon Donaldson with thesis Extremal metrics and K-stability. Székelyhidi was a postdoc at Harvard University and was from 2008 to 2011 Ritt Assistant Professor at Columbia University. At the University of Notre Dame he became an assistant professor in 2011, an associate professor in 2014, and in 2016 a full professor. He is currently a professor at Northwestern University.

His research deals with geometric analysis and complex differential geometry (Kähler manifolds), including the existence of canonical metrics (such as extremal Kähler and Kähler-Einstein metrics) on projective manifolds, and the relations between extremal metrics and K-stability for polarised varieties and especially Fano varieties.

In 2014 he was an invited speaker at the International Congress of Mathematicians in Seoul. He was elected as a Fellow of the American Mathematical Society in the 2024 class of fellows.

== Selected publications ==
- Szekelyhidi, Gabor (2014). An introduction to extremal Kähler metrics. Providence, Rhode Island. ISBN 978-1-4704-1047-6. OCLC 871316164.
- Székelyhidi, Gábor (26 August 2014). "Blowing up extremal Kähler manifolds II". Inventiones Mathematicae. 200 (3). Springer Science and Business Media LLC: 925–977. arXiv:1302.0760. doi:10.1007/s00222-014-0543-y. ISSN 0020-9910. S2CID 253743595.
- Székelyhidi, Gábor (2010). "The Kähler-Ricci flow and K-polystability". American Journal of Mathematics. 132 (4). Project Muse: 1077–1090. arXiv:0803.1613. doi:10.1353/ajm.0.0128. ISSN 1080-6377. S2CID 16079530.
- Székelyhidi, Gábor (17 August 2010). "Greatest lower bounds on the Ricci curvature of Fano manifolds". Compositio Mathematica. 147 (1). Wiley: 319–331. arXiv:0903.5504. doi:10.1112/s0010437x10004938. ISSN 0010-437X. S2CID 17256163.
- Székelyhidi, Gábor; Tosatti, Valentino (28 December 2011). "Regularity of weak solutions of a complex Monge–Ampère equation". Analysis & PDE. 4 (3). Mathematical Sciences Publishers: 369–378. arXiv:0912.1808. doi:10.2140/apde.2011.4.369. ISSN 1948-206X. S2CID 54743527.
- Székelyhidi, Gábor (15 December 2006). "Extremal metrics and K-stability". Bulletin of the London Mathematical Society. 39 (1). Wiley: 76–84. arXiv:math/0410401. doi:10.1112/blms/bdl015. ISSN 0024-6093. S2CID 9812137.
- An introduction to extremal Kaehler metrics (pdf)
