= K-stability =

Algebro-geometric stability condition

In mathematics, and especially differential and algebraic geometry, K-stability is an algebro-geometric stability condition, for complex manifolds and complex algebraic varieties. The notion of K-stability was first introduced by Gang Tian and reformulated more algebraically later by Simon Donaldson. The definition was inspired by a comparison to geometric invariant theory (GIT) stability. In the special case of Fano varieties, K-stability precisely characterises the existence of Kähler–Einstein metrics. More generally, on any compact complex manifold, K-stability is conjectured to be equivalent to the existence of constant scalar curvature Kähler metrics (cscK metrics).

== History ==
In 1954, Eugenio Calabi formulated a conjecture about the existence of Kähler metrics on compact Kähler manifolds, now known as the Calabi conjecture. One formulation of the conjecture is that a compact Kähler manifold $X$ admits a unique Kähler–Einstein metric in the class $c_1(X)$. In the particular case where $c_1(X)=0$, such a Kähler–Einstein metric would be Ricci flat, making the manifold a Calabi–Yau manifold. The Calabi conjecture was resolved in the case where $c_1(X)<0$ by Thierry Aubin and Shing-Tung Yau, and when $c_1(X)=0$ by Yau. In the case where $c_1(X)>0$, that is when $X$ is a Fano manifold, a Kähler–Einstein metric does not always exist. Namely, it was known by work of Yozo Matsushima and André Lichnerowicz that a Kähler manifold with $c_1(X)>0$ can only admit a Kähler–Einstein metric if the Lie algebra $H^0(X, TX)$ is reductive. However, it can be easily shown that the blow up of the complex projective plane at one point, $\text{Bl}_p \mathbb{CP}^2$ is Fano, but does not have reductive Lie algebra. Thus not all Fano manifolds can admit Kähler–Einstein metrics.

After the resolution of the Calabi conjecture for $c_1(X)\le 0$ attention turned to the loosely related problem of finding canonical metrics on vector bundles over complex manifolds. In 1983, Donaldson produced a new proof of the Narasimhan–Seshadri theorem. As proved by Donaldson, the theorem states that a holomorphic vector bundle over a compact Riemann surface is stable if and only if it corresponds to an irreducible unitary Yang–Mills connection. That is, a unitary connection which is a critical point of the Yang–Mills functional

$$\operatorname{YM}(\nabla) = \int_X \|F_{\nabla}\|^2 \, d \operatorname{vol} .$$

On a Riemann surface such a connection is projectively flat, and its holonomy gives rise to a projective unitary representation of the fundamental group of the Riemann surface, thus recovering the original statement of the theorem by M. S. Narasimhan and C. S. Seshadri. During the 1980s this theorem was generalised through the work of Donaldson, Karen Uhlenbeck and Yau, and Jun Li and Yau to the Kobayashi–Hitchin correspondence, which relates stable holomorphic vector bundles to Hermitian–Einstein connections over arbitrary compact complex manifolds. A key observation in the setting of holomorphic vector bundles is that once a holomorphic structure is fixed, any choice of Hermitian metric gives rise to a unitary connection, the Chern connection. Thus one can either search for a Hermitian–Einstein connection, or its corresponding Hermitian–Einstein metric.

Inspired by the resolution of the existence problem for canonical metrics on vector bundles, in 1993 Yau was motivated to conjecture the existence of a Kähler–Einstein metric on a Fano manifold should be equivalent to some form of algebro-geometric stability condition on the variety itself, just as the existence of a Hermitian–Einstein metric on a holomorphic vector bundle is equivalent to its stability. Yau suggested this stability condition should be an analogue of slope stability of vector bundles.

In 1997, Tian suggested such a stability condition, which he called K-stability after the K-energy functional introduced by Toshiki Mabuchi. The K originally stood for kinetic due to the similarity of the K-energy functional with the kinetic energy, and for the German kanonisch for the canonical bundle. Tian's definition was analytic in nature, and specific to the case of Fano manifolds. Several years later Donaldson introduced an algebraic condition described in this article called K-stability, which makes sense on any polarised variety, and is equivalent to Tian's analytic definition in the case of the polarised variety $(X, -K_X)$ where $X$ is Fano.

== Definition ==
In this section we work over the complex numbers $\Complex$, but the essential points of the definition apply over any field. A polarised variety is a pair $(X,L)$ where $X$ is a complex algebraic variety and $L$ is an ample line bundle on $X$. Such a polarised variety comes equipped with an embedding into projective space using the Proj construction,

$$X \cong \operatorname{Proj} \bigoplus_{r\ge 0} H^0 \left(X, L^{kr}\right) \hookrightarrow \mathbb{P}\left(H^0\left(X, L^k\right)^*\right)$$

where $k$ is any positive integer large enough that $L^k$ is very ample, and so every polarised variety is projective. Changing the choice of ample line bundle $L$ on $X$ results in a new embedding of $X$ into a possibly different projective space. Therefore a polarised variety can be thought of as a projective variety together with a fixed embedding into some projective space $\mathbb{CP}^N$.

=== Hilbert–Mumford criterion ===
K-stability is defined by analogy with the Hilbert–Mumford criterion from finite-dimensional geometric invariant theory. This theory describes the stability of points on polarised varieties, whereas K-stability concerns the stability of the polarised variety itself.

The Hilbert–Mumford criterion shows that to test the stability of a point $x$ in a projective algebraic variety $X\subset \mathbb{CP}^N$ under the action of a reductive algebraic group $G\subset \operatorname{GL}(N+1,\mathbb{C})$, it is enough to consider the one parameter subgroups (1-PS) of $G$. To proceed, one takes a 1-PS of $G$, say $\lambda: \mathbb{C}^* \hookrightarrow G$, and looks at the limiting point

$$x_0 = \lim_{t\to 0} \lambda(t) \cdot x .$$

This is a fixed point of the action of the 1-PS $\lambda$, and so the line over $x$ in the affine space $\mathbb{C}^{N+1}$ is preserved by the action of $\lambda$. An action of the multiplicative group $\mathbb{C}^*$ on a one dimensional vector space comes with a weight, an integer we label $\mu(x,\lambda)$, with the property that

$$\lambda(t) \cdot \tilde{x} = t^{\mu(x,\lambda)} \tilde{x}$$

for any $\tilde{x}$ in the fibre over $x_0$. The Hilbert-Mumford criterion says:

- The point $x$ is semistable if $\mu(x,\lambda)\le 0$ for all 1-PS $\lambda < G$.
- The point $x$ is stable if $\mu(x,\lambda)<0$ for all 1-PS $\lambda < G$.
- The point $x$ is unstable if $\mu(x,\lambda) >0$ for any 1-PS $\lambda < G$.

If one wishes to define a notion of stability for varieties, the Hilbert-Mumford criterion therefore suggests it is enough to consider one parameter deformations of the variety. This leads to the notion of a test configuration.

=== Test Configurations ===
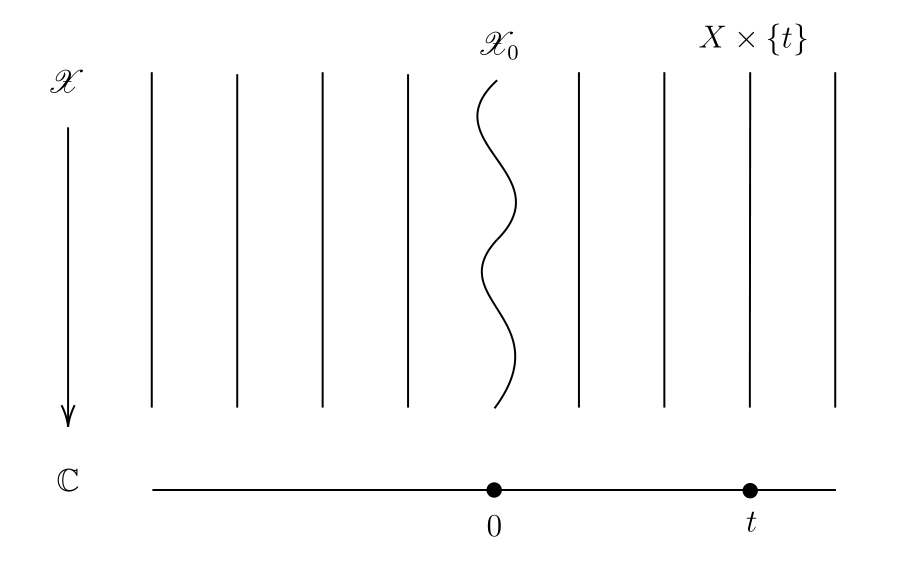
Generic fibres of a test configuration are all isomorphic to the variety X, whereas the central fibre may be distinct, and even singular.

A test configuration for a polarised variety $(X,L)$ is a pair $(\mathcal{X}, \mathcal{L})$ where $\mathcal{X}$ is a scheme with a flat morphism $\pi: \mathcal{X} \to \mathbb{C}$ and $\mathcal{L}$ is a relatively ample line bundle for the morphism $\pi$, such that:

1. For every $t\in \mathbb{C}$, the Hilbert polynomial of the fibre $(\mathcal{X}_t, \mathcal{L}_t)$ is equal to the Hilbert polynomial $\mathcal{P}(k)$ of $(X,L)$. This is a consequence of the flatness of $\pi$.
2. There is an action of $\mathbb{C}^*$ on the family $(\mathcal{X},\mathcal{L})$ covering the standard action of $\mathbb{C}^*$ on $\mathbb{C}$.
3. For any (and hence every) $t\in \mathbb{C}^*$, $(\mathcal{X}_t, \mathcal{L}_t) \cong (X,L)$ as polarised varieties. In particular away from $0\in \mathbb{C}$, the family is trivial: $(\mathcal{X}_{t\ne 0}, \mathcal{L}_{t\ne 0}) \cong (X\times \mathbb{C}^*,\operatorname{pr}_1^*L)$ where $\operatorname{pr}_1 : X\times \mathbb{C}^* \to X$ is projection onto the first factor.

We say that a test configuration $(\mathcal{X}, \mathcal{L})$ is a product configuration if $\mathcal{X} \cong X\times \mathbb{C}$, and a trivial configuration if the $\mathbb{C}^*$ action on $\mathcal{X} \cong X\times \mathbb{C}$ is trivial on the first factor.

=== Donaldson–Futaki Invariant ===
To define a notion of stability analogous to the Hilbert–Mumford criterion, one needs a concept of weight $\mu(\mathcal{X},\mathcal{L})$ on the fibre over $0$ of a test configuration $(\mathcal{X},\mathcal{L})\to \mathbb{C}$ for a polarised variety $(X,L)$. By definition this family comes equipped with an action of $\mathbb{C}^*$ covering the action on the base, and so the fibre of the test configuration over $0\in \mathbb{C}$ is fixed. That is, we have an action of $\mathbb{C}^*$ on the central fibre $(\mathcal{X}_0,\mathcal{L}_0)$. In general this central fibre is not smooth, or even a variety. There are several ways to define the weight on the central fiber. The first definition was given by using Ding-Tian's version of generalized Futaki invariant. This definition is differential geometric and is directly related to the existence problems in Kähler geometry. Algebraic definitions were given by using Donaldson-Futaki invariants and CM-weights defined by intersection formula.

By definition an action of $\Complex^*$ on a polarised scheme comes with an action of $\Complex^*$ on the ample line bundle $\mathcal{L}_0$, and therefore induces an action on the vector spaces $H^0(\mathcal{X}_0, \mathcal{L}_0^k)$ for all integers $k\ge 0$. An action of $\Complex^*$ on a complex vector space $V$ induces a direct sum decomposition $V=V_1\oplus \cdots \oplus V_n$ into weight spaces, where each $V_i$ is a one dimensional subspace of $V$, and the action of $\mathbb{C}^*$ when restricted to $V_i$ has a weight $w_i$. Define the total weight of the action to be the integer $w=w_1+\cdots + w_n$. This is the same as the weight of the induced action of $\Complex^*$ on the one dimensional vector space $\bigwedge^n V$ where $n=\dim V$.

Define the weight function of the test configuration $(\mathcal{X},\mathcal{L})$ to be the function $w(k)$ where $w(k)$ is the total weight of the $\Complex^*$ action on the vector space $H^0(\mathcal{X}_0,\mathcal{L}_0^k)$ for each non-negative integer $k \ge 0$. Whilst the function $w(k)$ is not a polynomial in general, it becomes a polynomial of degree $n+1$ for all $k>k_0\gg 0$ for some fixed integer $k_0$, where $n = \dim X$. This can be seen using an equivariant Riemann-Roch theorem. Recall that the Hilbert polynomial $\mathcal{P}(k)$ satisfies the equality $\mathcal{P}(k)=\dim H^0(X, L^k) = \dim H^0(\mathcal{X}_0,\mathcal{L}_0^k)$ for all $k>k_1\gg 0$ for some fixed integer $k_1$, and is a polynomial of degree $n$. For such $k\gg 0$, let us write

$$\mathcal{P}(k) = a_0 k^n + a_1 k^{n-1} + O(k^{n-2}), \quad w(k) = b_0 k^{n+1} + b_1 k^n + O(k^{n-1}) .$$

The Donaldson-Futaki invariant of the test configuration $(\mathcal{X}, \mathcal{L})$ is the rational number

$$\operatorname{DF}(\mathcal{X}, \mathcal{L}) = \frac{b_0a_1-b_1a_0}{a_0^2} .$$

In particular $\operatorname{DF}(\mathcal{X}, \mathcal{L}) = -f_1$ where $f_1$ is the first order term in the expansion

$$\frac{w(k)}{k \mathcal{P}(k)} = f_0 + f_1 k^{-1} + O(k^{-2}) .$$

The Donaldson-Futaki invariant does not change if $L$ is replaced by a positive power $L^r$, and so in the literature K-stability is often discussed using $\mathbb{Q}$-line bundles.

It is possible to describe the Donaldson-Futaki invariant in terms of intersection theory, and this was the approach taken by Tian in defining the CM-weight. Any test configuration $(\mathcal{X}, \mathcal{L})$ admits a natural compactification $(\bar{\mathcal{X}}, \bar{\mathcal{L}})$ over $\mathbb{P}^1$ (e.g., see), then the CM-weight is defined by

$$CM({\mathcal{X}},{ \mathcal{L}})=\frac { 1 }{ 2(n+1)\cdot L^{ n } } \left( \mu \cdot n{ (\bar {\mathcal{L}} ) }^{ n+1 }+(n+1){ K }_{ \bar { \mathcal{X}} /{ \mathbb{P} }^{ 1 }}  \cdot { (\bar {\mathcal{L}} ) }^{ n } \right)$$

where $\mu= -\frac{L^{n-1}\cdot K_X}{L^n}$. This definition by intersection formula is now often used in algebraic geometry.

It is known that $\operatorname{ DF } (\mathcal{X}, \mathcal{L})$ coincides with $\operatorname {CM} (\mathcal{X}, \mathcal{L})$, so we can take the weight $\mu(\mathcal{X}, \mathcal{L})$ to be either $\operatorname{ DF } (\mathcal{X}, \mathcal{L})$ or $\operatorname {CM}(\mathcal{X}, \mathcal{L})$. The weight $\mu(\mathcal{X}, \mathcal{L})$ can be also expressed in terms of the Chow form and hyperdiscriminant. In the case of Fano manifolds, there is an interpretation of the weight in terms of new $\beta$-invariant on valuations found by Chi Li and Kento Fujita.

=== K-stability ===
In order to define K-stability, we need to first exclude certain test configurations. Initially it was presumed one should just ignore trivial test configurations as defined above, whose Donaldson-Futaki invariant always vanishes, but it was observed by Li and Xu that more care is needed in the definition. One elegant way of defining K-stability is given by Székelyhidi using the norm of a test configuration, which we first describe.

For a test configuration $(\mathcal{X}, \mathcal{L})$, define the norm as follows. Let $A_k$ be the infinitesimal generator of the $\mathbb{C}^*$ action on the vector space $H^0(X,L^k)$. Then $\operatorname{Tr}(A_k)=w(k)$. Similarly to the polynomials $w(k)$ and $\mathcal{P}(k)$, the function $\operatorname{Tr}(A_k^2)$ is a polynomial for large enough integers $k$, in this case of degree $n+2$. Let us write its expansion as

$$\operatorname{Tr}(A_k^2) = c_0 k^{n+2} + O(k^{n+1}).$$

The norm of a test configuration is defined by the expression

$$\|(\mathcal{X}, \mathcal{L})\|^2 = c_0 - \frac{b_0^2}{a_0}.$$

According to the analogy with the Hilbert-Mumford criterion, once one has a notion of deformation (test configuration) and weight on the central fibre (Donaldson-Futaki invariant), one can define a stability condition, called K-stability.

Let $(X,L)$ be a polarised algebraic variety. We say that $(X,L)$ is:

- K-semistable if $\operatorname{\mu }(\mathcal{X}, \mathcal{L})\ge 0$ for all test configurations $(\mathcal{X},\mathcal{L})$ for $(X,L)$.
- K-stable if $\operatorname{\mu }(\mathcal{X}, \mathcal{L})\ge 0$ for all test configurations $(\mathcal{X},\mathcal{L})$ for $(X,L)$, and additionally $\operatorname{\mu}(\mathcal{X}, \mathcal{L})> 0$ whenever $\|(\mathcal{X}, \mathcal{L})\|>0$.
- K-polystable if $(X,L)$ is K-semistable, and additionally whenever $\operatorname{\mu}(\mathcal{X}, \mathcal{L})=0$, the test configuration $(\mathcal{X}, \mathcal{L})$ is a product configuration.
- K-unstable if it is not K-semistable.

== Yau–Tian–Donaldson Conjecture ==
K-stability was originally introduced as an algebro-geometric condition which should characterise the existence of a Kähler–Einstein metric on a Fano manifold. This came to be known as the Yau–Tian–Donaldson [YTD] conjecture for Fano manifolds. The conjecture was resolved in the 2010s by Tian. The strategy is based on a continuity method with respect to the cone angle of a Kähler–Einstein metric with cone singularities along a fixed anticanonical divisor, as well as an in-depth use of the Cheeger–Colding–Tian theory of Gromov–Hausdorff limits of Kähler manifolds with Ricci bounds.

Theorem (Yau–Tian–Donaldson conjecture for Kähler–Einstein metrics): A Fano Manifold $X$ admits a Kähler–Einstein metric in the class of $c_1(X)$ if and only if the pair $(X,-K_X)$ is K-polystable.

More recently, a proof based on the "classical" continuity method was provided by Ved Datar and Gabor Székelyhidi, followed by a proof by Chen, Sun, and Bing Wang using the Kähler–Ricci flow. Robert Berman, Sébastien Boucksom, and Mattias Jonsson also provided a proof from the variational approach.

=== Extension to constant scalar curvature Kähler metrics ===
It is expected that the Yau–Tian–Donaldson conjecture should apply more generally to cscK metrics over arbitrary smooth polarised varieties. In fact, the YTD conjecture refers to this more general setting, with the case of Fano manifolds being a special case, which was conjectured earlier by Yau and Tian. Donaldson built on the conjecture of Yau and Tian from the Fano case after his definition of K-stability for arbitrary polarised varieties was introduced.

Yau–Tian–Donaldson conjecture for constant scalar curvature metrics: A smooth polarised variety $(X,L)$ admits a constant scalar curvature Kähler metric in the class of $c_1(L)$ if and only if the pair $(X,L)$ is K-polystable.

As discussed, the YTD conjecture has been resolved in the Fano setting. It was proven by Donaldson in 2009 that the conjecture holds for toric varieties of complex dimension 2. For arbitrary polarised varieties it was proven by Stoppa, also using work of Arezzo and Pacard, that the existence of a cscK metric implies K-polystability. This is in some sense the easy direction of the conjecture, as it assumes the existence of a solution to a difficult partial differential equation, and arrives at the comparatively easy algebraic result. The significant challenge is to prove the reverse direction, namely whether a purely algebraic condition implies the existence of a solution to a PDE.

According to a preprint first submitted to arXiv on 28 May 2026 by Antonio Trusiani, the uniform version of the cscK Yau–Tian–Donaldson conjecture is true. More precisely, it states that a smooth polarised projective variety $(X,L)$ admits a cscK metric in $c_1(L)$ if and only if it is $\operatorname{Aut}^{\circ}(X,L)$-uniformly K-stable.

According to a preprint first submitted to arXiv on 19 August 2026 by Jihao Liu, there is a smooth polarised projective fivefold that is K-polystable with respect to every normal ample algebraic test configuration of every positive exponent, but whose polarisation class contains no extremal Kähler metric and hence no cscK metric; this would give a counterexample to the conjecture for the non-uniform version of the cscK YTD conjecture.

== Examples ==
=== Smooth Curves ===
It has been known since the original work of Pierre Deligne and David Mumford that smooth algebraic curves are asymptotically stable in the sense of geometric invariant theory, and in particular that they are K-stable. In this setting, the Yau–Tian–Donaldson conjecture is equivalent to the uniformization theorem. Namely, every smooth curve admits a Kähler–Einstein metric of constant scalar curvature either $+1$ in the case of the projective line $\mathbb{CP}^1$, $0$ in the case of elliptic curves, or $-1$ in the case of compact Riemann surfaces of genus $g > 1$.

=== Fano varieties ===
The setting where $L=-K_X$ is ample so that $X$ is a Fano manifold is of particular importance, and in that setting many tools are known to verify the K-stability of Fano varieties. For example using purely algebraic techniques it can be proven that all Fermat hypersurfaces

$F_{n,d} = \{z\in \mathbb{CP}^{n+1}\mid z_0^d + \cdots z_{n+1}^d = 0\} \subset \mathbb{CP}^{n+1}$

are K-stable Fano varieties for $3 \le d \le n+1$.

=== Toric Varieties ===
K-stability was originally introduced by Donaldson in the context of toric varieties. In the toric setting many of the complicated definitions of K-stability simplify to be given by data on the moment polytope $P$ of the polarised toric variety $(X_P, L_P)$. First it is known that to test K-stability, it is enough to consider toric test configurations, where the total space of the test configuration is also a toric variety. Any such toric test configuration can be elegantly described by a convex function on the moment polytope, and Donaldson originally defined K-stability for such convex functions. If a toric test configuration $(\mathcal{X},\mathcal{L})$ for $(X_P, L_P)$ is given by a convex function $f$ on $P$, then the Donaldson-Futaki invariant can be written as

$$\operatorname{DF}(\mathcal{X},\mathcal{L}) = \frac{1}{2} \mathcal{L}(f) = \frac{1}{2} \left( \int_{\partial P} f \,d\sigma - a \int_{P} f\, d\mu\right) ,$$

where $d\mu$ is the Lebesgue measure on $P$, $d\sigma$ is the canonical measure on the boundary of $P$ arising from its description as a moment polytope (if an edge of $P$ is given by a linear inequality $h(x) \le a$ for some affine linear functional h on $\mathbb{R}^n$ with integer coefficients, then $d\mu = \pm dh \wedge d\sigma$), and $a = \operatorname{Vol}(\partial P, d\sigma)/\operatorname{Vol}(P, d\mu)$. Additionally the norm of the test configuration can be given by

$$\left\|(\mathcal{X},\mathcal{L}) \right\| = \left\|f - \bar{f}\right\|_{L^2} ,$$

where $\bar{f}$ is the average of $f$ on $P$ with respect to $d\mu$.

It was shown by Donaldson that for toric surfaces, it suffices to test convex functions of a particularly simple form. We say a convex function on $P$ is piecewise-linear if it can be written as a maximum $f = \max (h_1, \dots, h_n)$ for some affine linear functionals $h_1,\dots,h_n$. Notice that by the definition of the constant $a$, the Donaldson-Futaki invariant $\mathcal{L}(f)$ is invariant under the addition of an affine linear functional, so we may always take one of the $h_i$ to be the constant function $0$. We say a convex function is simple piecewise-linear if it is a maximum of two functions, and so is given by $f = \max (0, h)$ for some affine linear function $h$, and simple rational piecewise-linear if $h$ has rational cofficients. Donaldson showed that for toric surfaces it is enough to test K-stability only on simple rational piecewise-linear functions. Such a result is powerful in so far as it is possible to readily compute the Donaldson-Futaki invariants of such simple test configurations, and therefore computationally determine when a given toric surface is K-stable.

An example of a K-unstable manifold is given by the toric surface $\mathbb{F}_1 = \operatorname{Bl}_0\mathbb{CP}^2$, the first Hirzebruch surface, which is the blow up of the complex projective plane at a point, with respect to the polarisation given by $L = \frac{1}{2}(\pi^* \mathcal{O}(2) - E)$, where $\pi: \mathbb{F}_1 \to \mathbb{CP}^2$ is the blow up and $E$ the exceptional divisor.

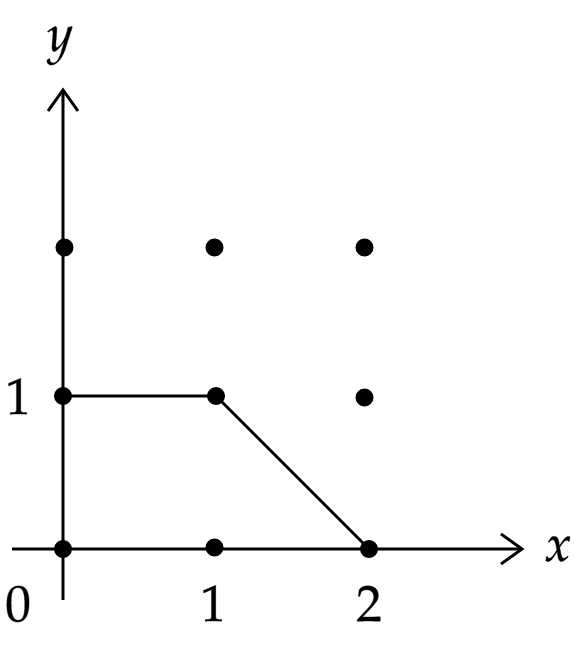
The moment polytope of the first Hirzebruch surface.

The measure $d\sigma$ on the horizontal and vertical boundary faces of the polytope are just $dx$ and $dy$. On the diagonal face $x+y=2$ the measure is given by $(dx-dy)/2$. Consider the convex function $f(x,y)=x+y$ on this polytope. Then

$$\int_P f\, d\mu = \frac{11}{6},\qquad \int_{\partial P} f\, d\sigma = 6 ,$$

and

$$\operatorname{Vol}(P, d\mu)=\frac{3}{2},\qquad \operatorname{Vol}(\partial P, d\sigma) = 5 ,$$

Thus

$$\mathcal{L}(f) = 6-\frac{55}{9} = -\frac{1}{9} < 0 ,$$

and so the first Hirzebruch surface $\mathbb{F}_1$ is K-unstable.

== Alternative Notions ==
=== Hilbert and Chow Stability ===
K-stability arises from an analogy with the Hilbert-Mumford criterion for finite-dimensional geometric invariant theory. It is possible to use geometric invariant theory directly to obtain other notions of stability for varieties that are closely related to K-stability.

Take a polarised variety $(X,L)$ with Hilbert polynomial $\mathcal{P}$, and fix an $r>0$ such that $L^r$ is very ample with vanishing higher cohomology. The pair $(X,L^r)$ can then be identified with a point in the Hilbert scheme of subschemes of $\mathbb{P}^{\mathcal{P}(r)-1}$ with Hilbert polynomial $\mathcal{P}'(K) = \mathcal{P}(Kr)$.

This Hilbert scheme can be embedded into projective space as a subscheme of a Grassmannian (which is projective via the Plücker embedding). The general linear group $\operatorname{GL}(\mathcal{P}(r), \mathbb{C})$ acts on this Hilbert scheme, and two points in the Hilbert scheme are equivalent if and only if the corresponding polarised varieties are isomorphic. Thus one can use geometric invariant theory for this group action to give a notion of stability. This construction depends on a choice of $r>0$, so one says a polarised variety is asymptotically Hilbert stable if it is stable with respect to this embedding for all $r>r_0\gg0$ sufficiently large, for some fixed $r_0$.

There is another projective embedding of the Hilbert scheme called the Chow embedding, which provides a different linearisation of the Hilbert scheme and therefore a different stability condition. One can similarly therefore define asymptotic Chow stability. Explicitly the Chow weight for a fixed $r>0$ can be computed as

$$\operatorname{Chow}_r(\mathcal{X},\mathcal{L}) = \frac{rb_0}{a_0} - \frac{w(r)}{\mathcal{P}(r)}$$

for $r$ sufficiently large. Unlike the Donaldson-Futaki invariant, the Chow weight changes if the line bundle $L$ is replaced by some power $L^k$. However, from the expression

$$\operatorname{Chow}_{rk}(\mathcal{X},\mathcal{L^k}) = \frac{krb_0}{a_0} - \frac{w(kr)}{\mathcal{P}(kr)}$$

one observes that

$$\operatorname{DF}(\mathcal{X},\mathcal{L}) = \lim_{k\to\infty} \operatorname{Chow}_{rk}(\mathcal{X},\mathcal{L^k}) ,$$

and so K-stability is in some sense the limit of Chow stability as the dimension of the projective space $X$ is embedded in approaches infinity.

One may similarly define asymptotic Chow semistability and asymptotic Hilbert semistability, and the various notions of stability are related as follows:

Asymptotically Chow stable $\implies$ Asymptotically Hilbert stable $\implies$ Asymptotically Hilbert semistable $\implies$ Asymptotically Chow semistable $\implies$ K-semistable

It is however not know whether K-stability implies asymptotic Chow stability.

=== Slope K-Stability ===
It was originally predicted by Yau that the correct notion of stability for varieties should be analogous to slope stability for vector bundles. Julius Ross and Richard Thomas developed a theory of slope stability for varieties, known as slope K-stability. It was shown by Ross and Thomas that any test configuration is essentially obtained by blowing up the variety $X\times \mathbb{C}$ along a sequence of $\mathbb{C}^*$ invariant ideals, supported on the central fibre. This result is essentially due to David Mumford. Explicitly, every test configuration is dominated by a blow up of $X\times \mathbb{C}$ along an ideal of the form

$$I=I_0 + t I_1 + t^2 I_2 + \cdots + t^{r-1} I_{r-1} + (t^r)\subset \mathcal{O}_X \otimes \mathbb{C}[t],$$

where $t$ is the coordinate on $\mathbb{C}$. By taking the support of the ideals this corresponds to blowing up along a flag of subschemes

$$Z_{r-1} \subset \cdots \subset Z_2 \subset Z_1 \subset Z_0 \subset X$$

inside the copy $X\times \{0\}$ of $X$. One obtains this decomposition essentially by taking the weight space decomposition of the invariant ideal $I$ under the $\mathbb{C}^*$ action.

In the special case where this flag of subschemes is of length one, the Donaldson-Futaki invariant can be easily computed and one arrives at slope K-stability. Given a subscheme $Z\subset X$ defined by an ideal sheaf $I_Z$, the test configuration is given by

$$\mathcal{X} = \operatorname{Bl}_{Z\times\{0\}} (X\times \mathbb{C}) ,$$

which is the deformation to the normal cone of the embedding $Z\hookrightarrow X$.

If the variety $X$ has Hilbert polynomial $\mathcal{P}(k) = a_0 k^n + a_1 k^{n-1} + O(k^{n-2})$, define the slope of $X$ to be

$$\mu(X) = \frac{a_1}{a_0} .$$

To define the slope of the subscheme $Z$, consider the Hilbert-Samuel polynomial of the subscheme $Z$,

$$\chi(L^r \otimes I_Z^{xr}) = a_0(x) r^n + a_1(x)r^{n-1} + O(r^{n-2}) ,$$

for $r\gg 0$ and $x$ a rational number such that $xr \in \mathbb{N}$. The coefficients $a_i(x)$ are polynomials in $x$ of degree $n-i$, and the K-slope of $I_Z$ with respect to $c$ is defined by

$$\mu_c(I_Z) = \frac{\int_0^c \big(a_1(x) + \frac{a_0'(x)}{2}\big)\, dx}{\int_0^c a_0(x) \, dx}.$$

This definition makes sense for any choice of real number $c\in (0,\epsilon(Z)]$ where $\epsilon(Z)$ is the Seshadri constant of $Z$. Notice that taking $Z=\emptyset$ we recover the slope of $X$. The pair $(X,L)$ is slope K-semistable if for all proper subschemes $Z\subset X$, $\mu_c(I_Z) \le \mu(X)$ for all $c\in (0,\epsilon(Z)]$ (one can also define slope K-stability and slope K-polystability by requiring this inequality to be strict, with some extra technical conditions).

It was shown by Ross and Thomas that K-semistability implies slope K-semistability. However, unlike in the case of vector bundles, it is not the case that slope K-stability implies K-stability. In the case of vector bundles it is enough to consider only single subsheaves, but for varieties it is necessary to consider flags of length greater than one also. Despite this, slope K-stability can still be used to identify K-unstable varieties, and therefore by the results of Stoppa, give obstructions to the existence of cscK metrics. For example, Ross and Thomas use slope K-stability to show that the projectivisation of an unstable vector bundle over a K-stable base is K-unstable, and so does not admit a cscK metric. This is a converse to results of Hong, which show that the projectivisation of a stable bundle over a base admitting a cscK metric, also admits a cscK metric, and is therefore K-stable.

=== Filtration K-Stability ===
Work of Apostolov–Calderbank–Gauduchon–Tønnesen-Friedman shows the existence of a manifold which does not admit any extremal metric, but does not appear to be destabilised by any test configuration. This suggests that the definition of K-stability as given here may not be precise enough to imply the Yau–Tian–Donaldson conjecture in general. However, this example is destabilised by a limit of test configurations. This was made precise by Székelyhidi, who introduced filtration K-stability. A filtration here is a filtration of the coordinate ring

$$R = \bigoplus_{k\ge 0} H^0(X, L^k)$$

of the polarised variety $(X,L)$. The filtrations considered must be compatible with the grading on the coordinate ring in the following sense: A filtation $\chi$ of $R$ is a chain of finite-dimensional subspaces

$$\mathbb{C} = F_0 R \subset F_1 R \subset F_2 R \subset \dots \subset R$$

such that the following conditions hold:

1. The filtration is multiplicative. That is, $(F_iR)(F_jR) \subset F_{i+j}R$ for all $i,j\ge 0$.
2. The filtration is compatible with the grading on $R$ coming from the graded pieces $R_k = H^0(X, L^k)$. That is, if $f\in F_iR$, then each homogenous piece of $f$ is in $F_iR$.
3. The filtration exhausts $R$. That is, we have $\bigcup_{i\ge0} F_iR = R$.

Given a filtration $\chi$, its Rees algebra is defined by

$$\operatorname{Rees}(\chi) = \bigoplus_{i\ge 0} (F_i R)t^i \subset R[t].$$

We say that a filtration is finitely generated if its Rees algebra is finitely generated. It was proven by David Witt Nyström that a filtration is finitely generated if and only if it arises from a test configuration, and by Székelyhidi that any filtration is a limit of finitely generated filtrations. Combining these results Székelyhidi observed that the example of Apostolov-Calderbank-Gauduchon-Tønnesen-Friedman would not violate the Yau–Tian–Donaldson conjecture if K-stability was replaced by filtration K-stability. This suggests that the definition of K-stability may need to be edited to account for these limiting examples.

== See also ==
- Kähler manifold
- Kähler–Einstein metric
- K-stability of Fano varieties
- Geometric invariant theory
- Calabi conjecture
- Kobayashi–Hitchin correspondence
- Stable curve
