= Calabi flow =

In the mathematical fields of differential geometry and geometric analysis, the Calabi flow is a geometric flow which deforms a Kähler metric on a complex manifold. Precisely, given a Kähler manifold M, the Calabi flow is given by:

$$\frac{\partial g_{\alpha\overline{\beta}}}{\partial t}=\frac{\partial^2 R^g}{\partial z^\alpha\partial\overline{z}^\beta}$$,

where g is a mapping from an open interval into the collection of all Kähler metrics on M, R^{g} is the scalar curvature of the individual Kähler metrics, and the indices α, β correspond to arbitrary holomorphic coordinates z^{α}. This is a fourth-order geometric flow, as the right-hand side of the equation involves fourth derivatives of g.

The Calabi flow was introduced by Eugenio Calabi in 1982 as a suggestion for the construction of extremal Kähler metrics, which were also introduced in the same paper. It is the gradient flow of the Calabi functional; extremal Kähler metrics are the critical points of the Calabi functional.

A convergence theorem for the Calabi flow was found by Piotr Chruściel in the case that M has complex dimension equal to one. Xiuxiong Chen and others have made a number of further studies of the flow, although as of 2020 the flow is still not well understood.
