= Simon Donaldson =

English mathematician (born 1957)

Sir Simon Donaldson FRS MAE
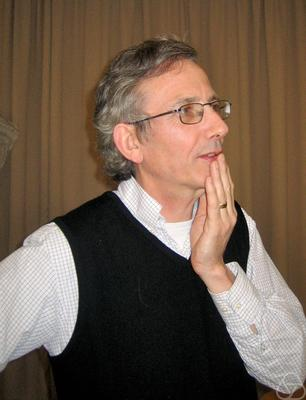
- Donaldson in 2009
- Born: Simon Kirwan Donaldson; 20 August 1957 (age 69); Cambridge, England
- Education: Pembroke College, Cambridge (BA); Worcester College, Oxford (DPhil)
- Known for: Topology of smooth (differentiable) four-dimensional manifolds Donaldson theory Donaldson theorem Donaldson invariant Donaldson–Thomas theory Donaldson–Uhlenbeck–Yau theorem K-stability; K-stability of Fano varieties Yau–Tian–Donaldson conjecture
- Awards: Junior Whitehead Prize (1985); Fields Medal (1986); Royal Medal (1992); Crafoord Prize (1994); Pólya Prize (1999); King Faisal International Prize (2006); Nemmers Prize in Mathematics (2008); Shaw Prize in Mathematics (2009); Breakthrough Prize in Mathematics (2014); Oswald Veblen Prize (2019); Wolf Prize in Mathematics (2020)
- Scientific career
- Fields: Topology
- Workplaces: Imperial College London; Stony Brook University; Institute for Advanced Study; Stanford University; University of Oxford
- Thesis: The Yang–Mills Equations on Kähler Manifolds (1983)
- Doctoral advisor: Michael Atiyah; Nigel Hitchin
- Doctoral students: Oscar Garcia Prada; Dominic Joyce; Dieter Kotschick; Graham Nelson; Paul Seidel; Ivan Smith; Gábor Székelyhidi; Richard Thomas; Michael Thaddeus

Sir Simon Kirwan Donaldson FRS MAE (born 20 August 1957) is an English mathematician known for his work on the topology of smooth (differentiable) four-dimensional manifolds, Donaldson–Thomas theory, and his contributions to Kähler geometry. He is currently a Professor in Pure Mathematics at Imperial College London. After being a member of the Simons Center for Geometry and Physics (SCGP) for a decade, he holds Emeritus Professor status at the SCGP and Stony Brook University, in New York state.

== Biography ==
Donaldson's father was an electrical engineer in the physiology department at the University of Cambridge, and his mother earned a science degree there. Donaldson gained a BA degree in mathematics from Pembroke College, Cambridge, in 1979, and in 1980 began postgraduate work at Worcester College, Oxford, at first under Nigel Hitchin and later under Michael Atiyah's supervision. Still a postgraduate student, Donaldson proved in 1982 a result that would establish his fame and later become known as Donaldson's theorem. He published the result in a paper "Self-dual connections and the topology of smooth 4-manifolds" which appeared in 1983. In the words of Atiyah, the paper "stunned the mathematical world."

Whereas Michael Freedman classified topological four-manifolds with Freedman's classification, Donaldson's work focused on four-manifolds admitting a differentiable structure, using instantons, a particular solution to the equations of Yang–Mills gauge theory which has its origin in quantum field theory. One of Donaldson's first results gave severe restrictions on the intersection form of a smooth four-manifold. As a consequence, a large class of the topological four-manifolds do not admit any smooth structure at all. Donaldson also derived polynomial invariants from gauge theory, which became known as Donaldson invariants. These were new topological invariants sensitive to the underlying smooth structure of the four-manifold. They made it possible to deduce the existence of "exotic" smooth structures—certain topological four-manifolds could carry an infinite family of different smooth structures.

After gaining his DPhil degree from Oxford University in 1983, Donaldson was appointed a Junior Research Fellow at All Souls College, Oxford. He spent the academic year 1983–84 at the Institute for Advanced Study in Princeton.

Simon returned to Oxford as Wallis Professor of Mathematics in 1985. After spending one year visiting Stanford University, he moved to Imperial College London in 1998 as Professor of Pure Mathematics.

In 2014, he joined the Simons Center for Geometry and Physics at Stony Brook University in New York, United States.

== Awards ==
Donaldson was an invited speaker of the International Congress of Mathematicians (ICM) in 1983, and a plenary speaker at the ICM in 1986, 1998, and 2018.

In 1985, Donaldson received the Junior Whitehead Prize from the London Mathematical Society. In 1994, he was awarded the Crafoord Prize in Mathematics. In February 2006, Donaldson was awarded the King Faisal International Prize for science for his work in pure mathematical theories linked to physics, which have helped in forming an understanding of the laws of matter at a subnuclear level. In April 2008, he was awarded the Nemmers Prize in Mathematics, a mathematics prize awarded by Northwestern University.

In 2009, he was awarded the Shaw Prize in Mathematics (jointly with Clifford Taubes) for their contributions to geometry in 3 and 4 dimensions.

In 2014, he was awarded the Breakthrough Prize in Mathematics "for the new revolutionary invariants of 4-dimensional manifolds and for the study of the relation between stability in algebraic geometry and in global differential geometry, both for bundles and for Fano varieties."

In January 2019, he was awarded the Oswald Veblen Prize in Geometry (jointly with Xiuxiong Chen and Song Sun). In 2020 he received the Wolf Prize in Mathematics (jointly with Yakov Eliashberg).

In 1986, he was elected a Fellow of the Royal Society (FRS) and received a Fields Medal at the International Congress of Mathematicians (ICM) in Berkeley. He became a Member of the Academia Europaea (MAE) in 1993. In 2010, Donaldson was elected a foreign member of the Royal Swedish Academy of Sciences.

He was knighted in the 2012 New Year Honours for services to mathematics. In 2012, he became a fellow of the American Mathematical Society.

In March 2014, he was awarded the degree "Docteur Honoris Causa" by Université Joseph Fourier, Grenoble. In January 2017, he was awarded the degree "Doctor Honoris Causa" by the Universidad Complutense de Madrid, Spain.

== Research ==
Donaldson's work is on the application of mathematical analysis (especially the analysis of elliptic partial differential equations) to problems in geometry. The problems mainly concern gauge theory, 4-manifolds, complex differential geometry and symplectic geometry. The following theorems have been mentioned:

- The diagonalizability theorem (Donaldson 1983a, 1983b, 1987a): If the intersection form of a smooth, closed, simply connected 4-manifold is positive- or negative-definite then it is diagonalizable over the integers. This result is sometimes called Donaldson's theorem.
- A smooth h-cobordism between simply connected 4-manifolds need not be trivial (Donaldson 1987b). This contrasts with the situation in higher dimensions.
- A stable holomorphic vector bundle over a non-singular projective algebraic variety admits a Hermitian–Einstein metric (Donaldson 1987c), proven using an inductive proof and the theory of determinant bundles and Quillen metrics.
- A non-singular, projective algebraic surface can be diffeomorphic to the connected sum of two oriented 4-manifolds only if one of them has negative-definite intersection form (Donaldson 1990). This was an early application of the Donaldson invariant (or instanton invariants).
- Any compact symplectic manifold admits a symplectic Lefschetz pencil (Donaldson 1999).

Donaldson's recent work centers on a problem in complex differential geometry concerning a conjectural relationship between algebro-geometric "stability" conditions for smooth projective varieties and the existence of "extremal" Kähler metrics, typically those with constant scalar curvature (see for example cscK metric). Donaldson obtained results in the toric case of the problem (see for example Donaldson (2001)). He then solved the Kähler–Einstein case of the problem in 2012, in collaboration with Chen and Sun. This latest spectacular achievement involved a number of difficult and technical papers. The first of these was the paper of Donaldson & Sun (2014) on Gromov–Hausdorff limits. The summary of the existence proof for Kähler–Einstein metrics appears in Chen, Donaldson & Sun (2014). Full details of the proofs appear in Chen, Donaldson, and Sun (2015a, 2015b, 2015c).

=== Conjecture on Fano manifolds and Veblen Prize ===
In 2019, Donaldson was awarded the Oswald Veblen Prize in Geometry, together with Xiuxiong Chen and Song Sun, for proving a long-standing conjecture on Fano manifolds, which states "that a Fano manifold admits a Kähler–Einstein metric if and only if it is K-stable". It had been one of the most actively investigated topics in geometry since its proposal in the 1980s by Shing-Tung Yau after he proved the Calabi conjecture. It was later generalized by Gang Tian and Donaldson. The solution by Chen, Donaldson and Sun was published in the Journal of the American Mathematical Society in 2015 as a three-article series, "Kähler–Einstein metrics on Fano manifolds, I, II and III".

== Personal life ==
During 1983–1984 Donaldson visited the Department of Mathematics at the University of Maryland where he met Nora, his future wife, who was then a PhD student. They had three children, Andres Michael, Cat and Nicholas who joined Adriana, Simon’s step-daughter. Nora is Professor Emeritus at King's College London.

== Selected publications ==
- Donaldson, Simon K. (1983a). "An application of gauge theory to four-dimensional topology". J. Differential Geom. 18 (2): 279–315. doi:10.4310/jdg/1214437665. MR 0710056.
- ——— (1983b). "Self-dual connections and the topology of smooth 4-manifolds". Bull. Amer. Math. Soc. 8 (1): 81–83. doi:10.1090/S0273-0979-1983-15090-5. MR 0682827.
- ——— (1984b). "Instantons and geometric invariant theory". Comm. Math. Phys. 93 (4): 453–460. Bibcode:1984CMaPh..93..453D. doi:10.1007/BF01212289. MR 0892034. S2CID 120209762.
- ——— (1987a). "The orientation of Yang-Mills moduli spaces and 4-manifold topology". J. Differential Geom. 26 (3): 397–428. doi:10.4310/jdg/1214441485. MR 0910015.
- ——— (1987b). "Irrationality and the h-cobordism conjecture". J. Differential Geom. 26 (1): 141–168. doi:10.4310/jdg/1214441179. MR 0892034.
- ——— (1987c). "Infinite determinants, stable bundles and curvature". Duke Math. J. 54 (1): 231–247. doi:10.1215/S0012-7094-87-05414-7. MR 0885784.
- ——— (1990). "Polynomial invariants for smooth four-manifolds". Topology. 29 (3): 257–315. doi:10.1016/0040-9383(90)90001-Z. MR 1066174.
- ——— (1999). "Lefschetz pencils on symplectic manifolds". J. Differential Geom. 53 (2): 205–236. doi:10.4310/jdg/1214425535. MR 1802722.
- ——— (2001). "Scalar curvature and projective embeddings. I". J. Differential Geom. 59 (3): 479–522. doi:10.4310/jdg/1090349449. MR 1916953.
- ———; Sun, Song (2014). "Gromov-Hausdorff limits of Kähler manifolds and algebraic geometry". Acta Math. 213 (1): 63–106. arXiv:1206.2609. doi:10.1007/s11511-014-0116-3. MR 3261011. S2CID 120450769.
- Chen, Xiuxiong; Donaldson, Simon; Sun, Song (2014). "Kähler-Einstein metrics and stability". Int. Math. Res. Notices. 2014 (8): 2119–2125. arXiv:1210.7494. doi:10.1093/imrn/rns279. MR 3194014. S2CID 119165036.
- Chen, Xiuxiong; Donaldson, Simon; Sun, Song (2015a). "Kähler-Einstein metrics on Fano manifolds I: Approximation of metrics with cone singularities". J. Amer. Math. Soc. 28 (1): 183–197. arXiv:1211.4566. doi:10.1090/S0894-0347-2014-00799-2. MR 3264766. S2CID 119641827.
- Chen, Xiuxiong; Donaldson, Simon; Sun, Song (2015b). "Kähler-Einstein metrics on Fano manifolds II: Limits with cone angle less than 2π". J. Amer. Math. Soc. 28 (1): 199–234. arXiv:1212.4714. doi:10.1090/S0894-0347-2014-00800-6. MR 3264767. S2CID 119140033.
- Chen, Xiuxiong; Donaldson, Simon; Sun, Song (2015c). "Kähler-Einstein metrics on Fano manifolds III: Limits as cone angle approaches 2π and completion of the main proof". J. Amer. Math. Soc. 28 (1): 235–278. arXiv:1302.0282. doi:10.1090/S0894-0347-2014-00801-8. MR 3264768. S2CID 119575364.

Books

- Donaldson, Simon K.; Kronheimer, Peter B. (13 September 1990). The Geometry of Four-Manifolds. Oxford Mathematical Monographs. Oxford University Press. doi:10.1093/oso/9780198535539.001.0001. ISBN 978-0-198-53553-9. MR 1079726.
- Donaldson, S.K. (2002). Floer homology groups in Yang-Mills theory. Cambridge Tracts in Mathematics. Vol. 147. Cambridge: Cambridge University Press. ISBN 0-521-80803-0.
- Donaldson, Simon (2011). Riemann surfaces. Oxford Graduate Texts in Mathematics. Vol. 22. Oxford: Oxford University Press. doi:10.1093/acprof:oso/9780198526391.001.0001. ISBN 978-0-19-960674-0. MR 2856237.
