= Complex hyperbolic space =

In mathematics, the complex hyperbolic space is a Hermitian manifold which is the equivalent of the real hyperbolic space in the context of complex manifolds. The complex hyperbolic space is a Kähler manifold, and it is characterised by being the only simply connected complete Kähler manifold whose holomorphic sectional curvature is constant equal to −1. Its underlying Riemannian manifold has non-constant negative curvature, pinched between −1 and −1/4, or between −4 and −1, according to the choice of a normalization of the metric): in particular, it is a CAT(−1/4) space.

The complex hyperbolic space is also the symmetric space associated with the Lie group $\operatorname{PU}(n,1)$. These spaces constitute one of the three families of rank one symmetric spaces, together with real and quaternionic hyperbolic spaces, classification to which must be added one exceptional space, the Cayley plane. It is also the only family of Hermitian symmetric spaces having rank one.

== Construction of the complex hyperbolic space ==
=== Projective model ===
Let $\langle u,v\rangle := -u_1\overline{v_1} + u_2\overline{v_2} + \dots + u_{n+1}\overline{v_{n+1}}$ be a pseudo-Hermitian form of signature $(n,1)$ in the complex vector space $\mathbb{C}^{n+1}$. The projective model of the complex hyperbolic space is the projectivized space of all negative vectors for this form: $\mathbb{H}^n_\mathbb{C} = \{[\xi] \in \mathbb{CP}^n \mid \langle \xi,\xi\rangle <0\}.$

As an open set of the complex projective space, this space is endowed with the structure of a complex manifold. It is biholomorphic to the unit ball of $\mathbb{C}^n$, because every negative complex line is spanned by a unique vector of the form $(1,x_1,\dots,x_n)$ with $\sum_{i=1}^{n} |x_i|^2 < 1$. The map sending the point $(x_1,\dots,x_n)$ of the unit ball of $\mathbb{C}^n$ to the point $[1:x_1:\dots:x_n]$ of the projective space thus defines a biholomorphism.

This model is the equivalent of the Poincaré disk model. Unlike the real hyperbolic space, the complex projective space cannot be defined as a connected component of the hyperboloid $\langle x,x\rangle = -1$, because the projection of this hyperboloid onto the projective model has connected fiber $\mathbb{S}^1$ (the fiber being $\mathbb{Z}/2\mathbb{Z}$ in the real case).

A Hermitian metric is defined on $\mathbb{H}^n_\mathbb{C}$ in the following way: if $p\in \C^{n+1}$ belongs to the cone $\langle p,p\rangle=-1$, then the restriction of $\langle\cdot,\cdot\rangle$ to the orthogonal space $(\C p)^{\perp} \subset \C^{n+1}$ defines a definite positive hermitian product on this space, and because the tangent space of $\mathbb{H}^n_\mathbb{C}$ at the point $[p]$ can be naturally identified with $(\C p)^{\perp}$, this defines a hermitian inner product on $T_{[p]}\mathbb{H}^n_\mathbb{C}$. As can be seen by computation, this inner product does not depend on the choice of the representative $p$. In order to have holomorphic sectional curvature equal to -1 and not -4, one needs to renormalize this metric by a factor of $1/2$. This metric is a Kähler metric.

=== Siegel model ===
The Siegel model of complex hyperbolic space is the subset of $(w,z)\in\mathbb C\times\mathbb C^{n-1}$ such that

$$i(\bar w-w) > 2z\bar z.$$

It is biholomorphic to the unit ball in $\mathbb C^n$ via the Cayley transform

$$(w,z)\mapsto \left(\frac{w-i}{w+i},\frac{2z}{w+i}\right).$$

=== Boundary at infinity ===
In the projective model, the complex hyperbolic space identifies with the complex unit ball of dimension $n$, and its boundary can be defined as the boundary of the ball, which is diffeomorphic to the sphere of real dimension $2n-1$. This is equivalent to defining: $\partial\mathbb{H}^n_\mathbb{C} = \{[\xi] \in \mathbb{CP}^n | \langle \xi,\xi\rangle =0\}.$

As a CAT(0) space, the complex hyperbolic space also has a boundary at infinity $\partial_{\infty}\mathbb{H}^n_\mathbb{C}$. This boundary coincides with the boundary $\partial\mathbb{H}^n_\mathbb{C}$ just defined.

The boundary of the complex hyperbolic space naturally carries a CR structure. This structure is also the standard contact structure on the (odd dimensional) sphere.

== Group of holomorphic isometries and symmetric space ==
The group of holomorphic isometries of the complex hyperbolic space is the Lie group $\operatorname{PU}(n,1)$. This group acts transitively on the complex hyperbolic space, and the stabilizer of a point is isomorphic to the unitary group $\operatorname{U}(n)$. The complex hyperbolic space is thus homeomorphic to the homogeneous space $\operatorname{PU}(n,1)/\operatorname{U}(n)$. The stabilizer $\operatorname{U}(n)$ is the maximal compact subgroup of $\operatorname{PU}(n,1)$.

As a consequence, the complex hyperbolic space is the Riemannian symmetric space $\operatorname{SU}(n,1)/\mathrm{S}(\operatorname{U}(n)\times \operatorname{U}(1))=\operatorname{PU}(n,1)/\operatorname{U}(n)$, where $\operatorname{SU}(n,1)$ is the pseudo-unitary group and $\operatorname{PU}(n,1)$ is the quotient of $\operatorname{SU}(n,1)$ by its center, which is isomorphic to $\Z/(n+1)\Z$.

The group of holomorphic isometries of the complex hyperbolic space also acts on the boundary of this space, and acts thus by homeomorphisms on the closed disk $\bar{\mathbb{D}} = \mathbb{H}^n_{\mathbb{C}} \cup \partial\mathbb{H}^n_{\mathbb{C}}$. By Brouwer's fixed point theorem, any holomorphic isometry of the complex hyperbolic space must fix at least one point in $\bar{\mathbb{D}}$. There is a classification of isometries into three types:

- An isometry is said to be elliptic if it fixes a point in the complex hyperbolic space.
- An isometry is said to be parabolic if it does not fix a point in the complex hyperbolic space and fixes a unique point in the boundary.
- An isometry is said to be hyperbolic (or loxodromic) if it does not fix a point in the complex hyperbolic space and fixes exactly two points in the boundary.

The Iwasawa decomposition of $\operatorname{PU}(n,1)$ is the decomposition $\operatorname{PU}(n,1)=K\times A\times N$, where $K=\operatorname{U}(n)$ is the unitary group, $A=\mathbb{R}$ is the additive group of real numbers and $N=\mathcal{H_n}$ is the Heisenberg group of real dimension $2n-1$. Such a decomposition depends on the choice of:

- A point $\xi$ in the boundary of the complex hyperbolic space ($N$ is then the group of unipotent parabolic elements of $\operatorname{PU}(n,1)$ fixing $\xi$)
- An oriented geodesic line $\ell$ going to $\xi$ at infinity ($A$ is then the group of hyperbolic elements of $\operatorname{PU}(n,1)$ acting as a translation along this geodesic and with no rotational part around it)
- The choice of an origin for $\ell$, i.e. a unit speed parametrization $\gamma:\R\to \mathbb{H}^n_{\mathbb{C}}$ whose image is $\ell$ ($K$ is then the group of elliptic elements of $\operatorname{PU}(n,1)$ fixing $\gamma(0)$)

For any such decomposition of $\operatorname{PU}(n,1)$, the action of the subgroup $A\times N$ is free and transitive, hence induces a diffeomorphism $A\times N \to \mathbb{H}^n_{\mathbb{C}}$. This diffeomorphism can be seen as a generalization of the Siegel model.

== Curvature ==
The group of holomorphic isometries $\operatorname{PU}(n,1)$ acts transitively on the tangent complex lines of the hyperbolic complex space. This is why this space has constant holomorphic sectional curvature, that can be computed to be equal to -4 (with the above normalization of the metric). This property characterizes the hyperbolic complex space: up to isometric biholomorphism, there is only one simply connected complete Kähler manifold of given constant holomorphic sectional curvature.

Furthermore, when a Hermitian manifold has constant holomorphic sectional curvature equal to $k$, the sectional curvature of every real tangent plane $\Pi$ is completely determined by the formula:

$K(\Pi) = \frac{k}{4}\left(1+3\cos^2(\alpha(\Pi)\right)$

where $\alpha(\Pi)$ is the angle between $\Pi$ and $J\Pi$, ie the infimum of the angles between a vector in $\Pi$ and a vector in $J\Pi$. This angle equals 0 if and only if $\Pi$ is a complex line, and equals $\pi/2$ if and only if $\Pi$ is totally real. Thus the sectional curvature of the complex hyperbolic space varies from -4 (for complex lines) to -1 (for totally real planes).

In complex dimension 1, every real plane in the tangent space is a complex line: thus the hyperbolic complex space of dimension 1 has constant curvature equal to -1, and by the uniformization theorem, it is isometric to the real hyperbolic plane. Hyperbolic complex spaces can thus be seen as another high-dimensional generalization of the hyperbolic plane, less standard than the real hyperbolic spaces. A third possible generalization is the homogeneous space $SL_n(\mathbb{R})/SO_n(\mathbb{\R})$, which for $n=2$ again coincides with the hyperbolic plane, but becomes a symmetric space of rank greater than 1 when $n\ge 3$.

== Totally geodesic subspaces ==
Every totally geodesic submanifold of the complex hyperbolic space of dimension n is one of the following:

- a copy of a complex hyperbolic space of smaller dimension
- a copy of a real hyperbolic space of real dimension smaller than $n$

In particular, there is no codimension 1 totally geodesic subspace of the complex hyperbolic space.

== Link with other metrics on the ball ==
- On the unit ball, the complex hyperbolic metric coincides, up to some scalar renormalization, with the Bergman metric. This implies that every biholomorphism of the ball is actually an isometry of the complex hyperbolic metric.
- The complex hyperbolic metric also coincides with the Kobayashi metric.
- Up to renormalization, the complex hyperbolic metric is Kähler-Einstein, which means that its Ricci curvature is a multiple of the metric.

== See also ==
- Hyperbolic space
- Quaternionic hyperbolic space

== Sources ==
- Cano, Angel; Navarrete, Juan Pablo; Seade, José (2013). Complex Kleinian Groups. Progress in Mathematics. Vol. 303. doi:10.1007/978-3-0348-0481-3. ISBN 978-3-0348-0480-6.
- Goldman, William M. (1999). Complex hyperbolic geometry. Oxford: Clarendon Press. p. xx + 316. ISBN 0-19-853793-X.
- Kobayashi, Shōshichi; Nomizu, Katsumi (1996). Foundations of differential geometry, vol. 2. New York: Wiley. ISBN 0-471-15733-3. OCLC 34259751.
