= Toshiki Mabuchi =

Japanese mathematician

Toshiki Mabuchi (kanji: 満渕俊樹, hiragana: マブチ トシキ, Mabuchi Toshiki, born in 1950) is a Japanese mathematician, specializing in complex differential geometry and algebraic geometry. In 2006 in Madrid he was an invited speaker at the International Congress of Mathematicians. Mabuchi is known for introducing the Mabuchi functional.

== Education and career ==
In 1972 Mabuchi graduated from the University of Tokyo Faculty of Science and became a graduate student in mathematics at the University of California, Berkeley. There he graduated with a Ph.D. in 1977 with thesis C3-Actions and Algebraic Threefolds with Ample Tangent Bundle and advisor Shoshichi Kobayashi As a postdoc Mabuchi was from 1977 to 1978 a guest researcher at the University of Bonn. Since 1978 he is a faculty member of the Department of Mathematics of Osaka University. His research deals with complex differential geometry, extremal Kähler metrics, stability of algebraic varieties, and the Hitchin–Kobayashi correspondence.

In 2006 Toshiki Mabuchi and Takashi Shioya received the Geometry Prize of the Mathematical Society of Japan.

== Research contributions ==
Mabuchi is well-known for his introduction, in 1986, of the Mabuchi energy, which gives a variational interpretation to the problem of Kähler metrics of constant scalar curvature. In particular, the Mabuchi energy is a real-valued function on a Kähler class whose Euler–Lagrange equation is the constant scalar curvature equation. In the case that the Kähler class represents the first Chern class of the complex manifold, one has a relation to the Kähler-Einstein problem, due to the fact that constant scalar curvature metrics in such a Kähler class must be Kähler-Einstein.

Owing to the second variation formulas for the Mabuchi energy, every critical point is stable. Furthermore, if one integrates a holomorphic vector field and pulls back a given Kähler metric by the corresponding one-parameter family of diffeomorphisms, then the corresponding restriction of the Mabuchi energy is a linear function of one real variable; its derivative is the Futaki invariant discovered a few years earlier by Akito Futaki. The Futaki invariant and Mabuchi energy are fundamental in understanding obstructions to the existence of Kähler metrics which are Einstein or which have constant scalar curvature.

A year later, by use of the ∂∂-lemma, Mabuchi considered a natural Riemannian metric on a Kähler class, which allowed him to define length, geodesics, and curvature; the sectional curvature of Mabuchi's metric is nonpositive. Along geodesics in the Kähler class, the Mabuchi energy is convex. So the Mabuchi energy has strong variational properties.

== Selected publications ==
=== Articles ===
- Mabuchi, Toshiki (1986). "$K$-energy maps integrating Futaki invariants". Tohoku Mathematical Journal. 38 (4): 575–593. doi:10.2748/tmj/1178228410. ISSN 0040-8735.
- Bando, Shigetoshi; Mabuchi, Toshiki (1987). "Uniqueness of Einstein Kähler Metrics Modulo Connected Group Actions". Algebraic Geometry, Sendai, 1985. pp. 11–40. doi:10.2969/aspm/01010011. ISBN 978-4-86497-068-6. ISSN 0920-1971.
- Mabuchi, Toshiki (1987). "Some symplectic geometry on compact Kähler manifolds. I". Osaka Journal of Mathematics. 24 (2): 227–252.

=== Books ===
- Mabuchi, Toshiki; Mukai, Shigeru, eds. (1993). Einstein Metrics and Yang-Mills Connections. Lecture Notes in Pure and Applied Mathematics. Vol. 145. CRC Press. ISBN 978-0-8247-9069-1.
- ——; Noguchi, Junjiro; Ochiai, Takushiro, eds. (1994). Geometry and Analysis on Complex Manifolds: Festschrift for Professor S. Kobayashi's 60th Birthday. World Scientific. ISBN 978-981-02-2067-9.
