= Xiuxiong Chen =

Chinese-American mathematician

Xiuxiong Chen (Chinese: 陈秀雄; pinyin: Chén Xiùxióng) is a Chinese-American mathematician whose research concerns differential geometry and differential equations. Professor at Stony Brook University since 2010, he was elected a Fellow of the American Mathematical Society in 2015 and awarded the Oswald Veblen Prize in Geometry in 2019. In 2019, he was awarded the Simons Investigator award.

== Biography ==
Chen was born in Qingtian County, Zhejiang, China. He entered the Department of Mathematics of the University of Science and Technology of China in 1982, and graduated in 1987. He subsequently studied under Peng Jiagui (彭家贵) at the Graduate School of the Chinese Academy of Sciences, where he earned his master's degree.

In 1989, he moved to the United States to study at the University of Pennsylvania. The last doctoral student of Eugenio Calabi, he obtained his Ph.D. in mathematics in 1994, with his dissertation on "Extremal Hermitian Matrices with Curvature Distortion in a Riemann Surface".

Chen was an instructor at McMaster University in Canada from 1994 to 1996. For the next two years he was a National Science Foundation postdoctoral fellow at Stanford University. He was an assistant professor at Princeton University from 1998 to 2002, before becoming an associate professor at the University of Wisconsin–Madison. He was promoted to full professor in 2005. Since October 2010 he has been a professor at Stony Brook University. In 2006, he founded the Pacific Rim Conference on Complex Geometry at the University of Science and Technology of China.

As of 2019, Chen has advised 17 Ph.D. students, including Song Sun and Bing Wang (王兵). He was elected a Fellow of the American Mathematical Society in 2015 "for contributions to differential geometry, particularly the theory of extremal Kahler metrics". He was an invited speaker at the 2002 International Congress of Mathematicians, in Beijing.

== Conjecture on Fano manifolds and Veblen Prize ==
In 2019, Chen was awarded the prestigious Oswald Veblen Prize in Geometry, together with English mathematician Simon Donaldson and Chen's former student Song Sun, for proving a long-standing conjecture on Fano manifolds, which states "that a Fano manifold admits a Kähler–Einstein metric if and only if it is K-stable". It had been one of the most actively investigated topics in geometry since a loose version of it was first proposed in the 1980s by eventual Fields Medalist Shing-Tung Yau after his proof of the Calabi conjecture. More precise versions were subsequently proposed by Chinese mathematician Gang Tian and Donaldson. The solution by Chen, Donaldson and Sun was published in the Journal of the American Mathematical Society in 2015 as a three-article series, "Kähler–Einstein metrics on Fano manifolds, I, II and III".

== Major publications ==
- Chen, Xiuxiong. The space of Kähler metrics. J. Differential Geom. 56 (2000), no. 2, 189–234.
- Chen, X. X.; Tian, G. Geometry of Kähler metrics and foliations by holomorphic discs. Publ. Math. Inst. Hautes Études Sci. No. 107 (2008), 1–107.
- Chen, Xiuxiong; Donaldson, Simon; Sun, Song. Kähler-Einstein metrics on Fano manifolds. I: Approximation of metrics with cone singularities. J. Amer. Math. Soc. 28 (2015), no. 1, 183–197.
- Chen, Xiuxiong; Donaldson, Simon; Sun, Song. Kähler-Einstein metrics on Fano manifolds. II: Limits with cone angle less than 2π. J. Amer. Math. Soc. 28 (2015), no. 1, 199–234.
- Chen, Xiuxiong; Donaldson, Simon; Sun, Song. Kähler-Einstein metrics on Fano manifolds. III: Limits as cone angle approaches 2π and completion of the main proof. J. Amer. Math. Soc. 28 (2015), no. 1, 235–278.
- Chen, Xiuxiong; Wang, Bing. Space of Ricci flows (II)—Part B: Weak compactness of the flows. J. Differential Geom. 116 (2020), no. 1, 1 - 123.
- Chen, Xiuxiong; Cheng, Jingrui. On the constant scalar curvature Kähler metrics (I)—A priori estimates. J. Amer. Math. Soc. 34 (2021), no. 4, 909–936.
- Chen, Xiuxiong; Cheng, Jingrui. On the constant scalar curvature Kähler metrics (II)—Existence results. J. Amer. Math. Soc. 34 (2021), no. 4, 937–1009.
