= Thierry Aubin =

French mathematician (1942–2009)

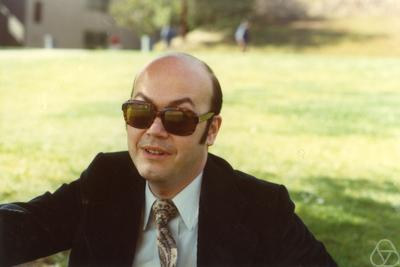
- Thierry Aubin in 1976 (photo by George Bergman)
- Born: 6 May 1942
- Died: 21 March 2009 (aged 66)
- Scientific career
- Fields: Mathematics
- Institutions: Pierre and Marie Curie University
- Doctoral advisor: André Lichnerowicz

Thierry Aubin (6 May 1942 – 21 March 2009) was a French mathematician who worked at the Centre de Mathématiques de Jussieu, and was a leading expert on Riemannian geometry and non-linear partial differential equations. His fundamental contributions to the theory of the Yamabe equation led, in conjunction with results of Trudinger and Schoen, to a proof of the Yamabe conjecture: every compact Riemannian manifold can be conformally rescaled to produce a manifold of constant scalar curvature. Along with Yau, he also showed that Kähler manifolds with negative first Chern classes always admit Kähler–Einstein metrics, a result closely related to the Calabi conjecture. The latter result, established by Yau, provides the largest class of known examples of compact Einstein manifolds. Aubin was the first mathematician to propose the Cartan–Hadamard conjecture.

Aubin was a visiting scholar at the Institute for Advanced Study in 1979. He was elected to the Académie des sciences in 2003.

== Research ==
In 1970, Aubin established that any closed smooth manifold of dimension larger than two has a Riemannian metric of negative scalar curvature. Furthermore, he proved that a Riemannian metric of nonnegative Ricci curvature can be deformed to positive Ricci curvature, provided that its Ricci curvature is strictly positive at one point.

In the same year, Aubin introduced an approach to the Calabi conjecture, in the field of Kähler geometry, via the calculus of variations. Later, in 1976, Aubin established the existence of Kähler–Einstein metrics on Kähler manifolds whose first Chern class is negative. Independently, Shing-Tung Yau proved the more powerful Calabi conjecture, which concerns the general problem of prescribing the Ricci curvature of a Kähler metric, via non-variational methods. As such, the existence of Kähler–Einstein metrics with negative first Chern class is often called the Aubin–Yau theorem. After learning Yau's techniques from Jerry Kazdan, Aubin found some simplifications and modifications of his work, along with Kazdan and Jean-Pierre Bourguignon.

Aubin made a number of fundamental contributions to the study of Sobolev spaces on Riemannian manifolds. He established Riemannian formulations of many classical results for Sobolev spaces, such as the equivalence of various definitions, the density of various subclasses of functions, and the standard embedding theorems. In one of Aubin's best-known works, the analysis of the optimal constant in the Sobolev embedding theorem was carried out. Along with similar results for the Moser–Trudinger inequality, Aubin later proved improvements of the optimal constants when the functions are assumed to satisfy certain orthogonality constraints.

Such results are naturally applicable to many problems in the field of geometric analysis. Aubin considered the Yamabe problem on conformal deformation to constant scalar curvature, which Yamabe had reduced to a problem in the calculus of variations. Following prior work of Neil Trudinger, Aubin was able to resolve the problem in high dimensions under the condition that the Weyl curvature is nonzero at some point. The key of Aubin's analysis is essentially local, with an estimate on the geometry of the Green's function based on the Weyl curvature. The more subtle case of locally conformally flat manifolds, along with the low-dimensional case, was later established by Richard Schoen as an application of Schoen and Yau's positive mass theorem.

All of the results outlined here, along with many others, were absorbed into Aubin's book Some Nonlinear Problems in Riemannian Geometry, which has become a basic part of the research literature.

== Major publications ==
Articles. Aubin was the author of around sixty research papers. The following, among the best-known, are outlined above.

- Aubin, Thierry (1970). "Métriques riemanniennes et courbure". Journal of Differential Geometry. 4 (4): 383–424. doi:10.4310/jdg/1214429638. MR 0279731. Zbl 0212.54102.
- Aubin, Thierry (1976a). "Espaces de Sobolev sur les variétés riemanniennes". Bulletin des Sciences Mathématiques. 2e Série. 100 (2): 149–173. MR 0488125. Zbl 0328.46030.
- Aubin, Thierry (1976b). "Problèmes isopérimétriques et espaces de Sobolev". Journal of Differential Geometry. 11 (4): 573–598. doi:10.4310/jdg/1214433725. MR 0448404. Zbl 0371.46011.
- Aubin, Thierry (1976c). "Équations différentielles non linéaires et problème de Yamabe concernant la courbure scalaire". Journal de Mathématiques Pures et Appliquées. Neuvième Série. 55 (3): 269–296. MR 0431287. Zbl 0336.53033.
- Aubin, Thierry (1976d). "Équations du type Monge–Ampère sur les variétés kähleriennes compactes". Comptes Rendus de l'Académie des Sciences, Série A. 283 (3): 119–121. MR 0433520. Zbl 0333.53040.
- Aubin, Thierry (1978). "Équations du type Monge–Ampère sur les variétés kählériennes compactes". Bulletin des Sciences Mathématiques. 2e Série. 102 (1): 63–95. MR 0494932. Zbl 0374.53022.
- Aubin, Thierry (1979). "Meilleures constantes dans le théorème d'inclusion de Sobolev et un théorème de Fredholm non linéaire pour la transformation conforme de la courbure scalaire". Journal of Functional Analysis. 32 (2): 148–174. doi:10.1016/0022-1236(79)90052-1. MR 0534672. Zbl 0411.46019.

Books

- Aubin, Thierry (1998). Some nonlinear problems in Riemannian geometry. Springer Monographs in Mathematics. Berlin: Springer-Verlag. doi:10.1007/978-3-662-13006-3. ISBN 3-540-60752-8. MR 1636569. Zbl 0896.53003.
  Expansion of:

Aubin, Thierry (1982). Nonlinear analysis on manifolds. Monge–Ampère equations. Grundlehren der mathematischen Wissenschaften. Vol. 252. New York: Springer-Verlag. doi:10.1007/978-1-4612-5734-9. ISBN 0-387-90704-1. MR 0681859. Zbl 0512.53044.

- Aubin, Thierry (2001). A course in differential geometry. Graduate Studies in Mathematics. Vol. 27. Providence, RI: American Mathematical Society. doi:10.1090/gsm/027. ISBN 0-8218-2709-X. MR 1799532. Zbl 0966.53001.
