= Sun Song =

Sun Song may refer to:

- Song Sun, Chinese mathematician
- Jazz by Sun Ra, a Sun Ra album reissued as Sun Song
