= Mabuchi functional =

In mathematics, and especially complex geometry, the Mabuchi functional or K-energy functional is a functional on the space of Kähler potentials of a compact Kähler manifold whose critical points are constant scalar curvature Kähler metrics. The Mabuchi functional was introduced by Toshiki Mabuchi in 1985 as a functional which integrates the Futaki invariant, which is an obstruction to the existence of a Kähler–Einstein metric on a Fano manifold.

The Mabuchi functional is an analogy of the log-norm functional of the moment map in geometric invariant theory and symplectic reduction. The Mabuchi functional appears in the theory of K-stability as an analytical functional which characterises the existence of constant scalar curvature Kähler metrics. The slope at infinity of the Mabuchi functional along any geodesic ray in the space of Kähler potentials is given by the Donaldson–Futaki invariant of a corresponding test configuration.

Due to the variational techniques of Berman–Boucksom–Jonsson in the study of Kähler–Einstein metrics on Fano varieties, the Mabuchi functional and various generalisations of it have become critically important in the study of K-stability of Fano varieties, particularly in settings with singularities.

== Definition ==
The Mabuchi functional is defined on the space of Kähler potentials inside a fixed Kähler cohomology class on a compact complex manifold. Let $(M,\omega)$ be a compact Kähler manifold with a fixed Kähler metric $\omega$. Then by the $\partial \bar \partial$-lemma, any other Kähler metric in the class $[\omega]\in H^2_{\text{dR}}(M)$ in de Rham cohomology may be related to $\omega$ by a smooth function $\varphi\in C^{\infty}(X)$, the Kähler potential:

$$\omega_\varphi = \omega + i \partial \bar \partial \varphi.$$

In order to ensure this new two-form is a Kähler metric, it must be a positive form:

$$\omega_\varphi > 0.$$

These two conditions define the space of Kähler potentials

$$\mathcal{K} = \{ \varphi: M \to \mathbb{R} \mid \varphi\in C^{\infty}(X),\quad \omega + i \partial \bar \partial \varphi > 0\}.$$

Since any two Kähler potentials which differ by a constant function define the same Kähler metric, the space of Kähler metrics in the class $[\omega]$ can be identified with $\mathcal{K}/\mathbb{R}$, the Kähler potentials modulo the constant functions. One can instead restrict to those Kähler potentials which normalise so that their integral over $M$ vanishes.

The tangent space to $\mathcal{K}$ can be identified with the space of smooth real-valued functions on $M$. Let $S_\varphi$ denote the scalar curvature of the Riemannian metric corresponding to $\omega_\varphi$, and let $\hat S$ denote the average of this scalar curvature over $M$, which does not depend on the choice of $\varphi$ by Stokes theorem. Define a differential one-form on the space of Kähler potentials by

$$\alpha_\varphi (\psi) = \int_M \psi (\hat S - S_\varphi) \omega_\varphi^n.$$

This one-form is closed. Since $\mathcal{K}$ is a contractible space, this one-form is exact, and there exists a functional $\mathcal{M}: \mathcal{K} \to \mathbb{R}$ normalised so that $\mathcal{M}(0)=0$ such that $d\mathcal{M} = \alpha$, the Mabuchi functional or K-energy.

The Mabuchi functional has an explicit description given by integrating the one-form $\alpha$ along a path. Let $\varphi_0$ be a fixed Kähler potential, which may be taken as $\varphi_0=0$, and let $\varphi_1=\varphi$, and $\varphi_t$ be a path in $\mathcal{K}$ from $\varphi_0$ to $\varphi_1$. Then

$$\mathcal{M}(\varphi) = \int_0^1 \int_M \dot \varphi_t (\hat S - S_{\varphi_t}) \omega_{\varphi_t}^n dt.$$

This integral can be shown to be independent of the choice of path $\varphi_t$.

== Constant scalar curvature Kähler metrics ==
From the definition of the Mabuchi functional in terms of the one-form $\alpha$, it can be seen that for a Kähler potential $\varphi\in \mathcal{K}$, the variation

$$\left.\frac{d}{dt}\right|_{t=0} \mathcal{M}(\varphi + t \psi) = \int_M \psi (\hat S - S_\varphi) \omega_\varphi^n$$

vanishes for all tangent vectors $\psi \in C^{\infty}(M)$ if and only if $\hat S = S_\varphi$. That is, the critical points of the Mabuchi functional are precisely the Kähler potentials which have constant scalar curvature.
