= Dieter Kotschick =

German mathematician

Dieter Kotschick (born 1963) is a German mathematician, specializing in differential geometry and topology.

== Biography ==
At age fifteen, Kotschick moved from Transylvania to Germany. He first studied at Heidelberg University and then at the University of Bonn. He received his doctorate from the University of Oxford in 1989 under the supervision of Simon Donaldson with thesis On the geometry of certain 4-manifolds and held postdoctoral positions at Princeton University and the University of Cambridge. He became a professor at the University of Basel in 1991 and a professor at LMU Munich in 1998. Kotschick has been a member of the Institute for Advanced Study three times (1989/90, 2008/09 and 2012/13). In 2012 he was elected a Fellow of the American Mathematical Society.

In 2009, he solved a 55-year-old open problem posed in 1954 by Friedrich Hirzebruch, which asks "which linear combinations of Chern numbers of smooth complex projective varieties are topologically invariant". He found that only linear combinations of the Euler characteristic and the Pontryagin numbers are invariants of orientation-preserving diffeomorphisms (and thus according to Sergei Novikov also of oriented homeomorphisms) of these varieties. Kotschick proved that if the condition of orientability is removed, only multiples of the Euler characteristic can be considered among the Chern numbers and their linear combinations as invariants of diffeomorphisms in three and more complex dimensions. For homeomorphisms, he showed that the restriction on the dimension can be omitted. In addition, Kotschick proved further theorems about the structure of the set of Chern numbers of smooth complex-projective manifolds.

He classified the possible patterns on the surface of an Adidas Telstar soccer ball, i.e. special tilings with pentagons and hexagons on the sphere. In the case of the sphere, there is only the standard football (12 black pentagons, 20 white hexagons, with a pattern corresponding to an icosahedral root) provided that "precisely three edges meet at every vertex". If more than three faces meet at some vertex, then there is a method to generate infinite sequences of different soccer balls by a topological construction called a branched covering. Kotschick's analysis also applies to fullerenes and polyhedra that Kotschick calls generalized soccer balls.

== Selected publications ==
- Kotschick, Dieter (1989). "On manifolds homeomorphic to $\mathbb{CP}^2\sharp 8\overline{\mathbb{CP}^2}$". Inventiones Mathematicae. 95 (3): 591–600. doi:10.1007/BF01393892. S2CID 121482589.
- Endo, Hisaaki; Kotschick, Dieter (2001). "Bounded cohomology and non-uniform perfection of mapping class groups". Inventiones Mathematicae. 144 (1): 169–175. arXiv:math/0010300. Bibcode:2001InMat.144..169E. doi:10.1007/s002220100128. S2CID 14799552.
- Gauge theory is dead! Long live gauge theory! (PDF - File, 95 kB), Notices of the AMS 42, March 1995, pp. 335–338 (on the Seiberg-Witten Theory)
- Topologie und Kombinatorik des Fußballs, Spektrum der Wissenschaft, 24 June 2006
- Amorós, Jaume; Burger, Marc; Corlette, Kevin; Kotschick, Dieter; Toledo, Domingo (1996). Fundamental groups of compact Kähler manifolds. Mathematical Surveys and Monographs. Vol. 44. Providence, RI: American Mathematical Society. ISBN 0-8218-0498-7.
