= Kobayashi metric =

Pseudometric of complex manifolds

In mathematics and especially complex geometry, the Kobayashi metric is a pseudometric intrinsically associated to any complex manifold. It was introduced by Shoshichi Kobayashi in 1967. Kobayashi hyperbolic manifolds are an important class of complex manifolds, defined by the property that the Kobayashi pseudometric is a metric. Kobayashi hyperbolicity of a complex manifold X implies that every holomorphic map from the complex line C to X is constant.

== Definition ==
The origins of the concept lie in Schwarz's lemma in complex analysis. Namely, if f is a holomorphic function on the open unit disc D in the complex numbers C such that f(0) = 0 and |f(z)| < 1 for all z in D, then the derivative f '(0) has absolute value at most 1. More generally, for any holomorphic map f from D to itself (not necessarily sending 0 to 0), there is a more complicated upper bound for the derivative of f at any point of D. However, the bound has a simple formulation in terms of the Poincaré metric, which is a complete Riemannian metric on D with curvature −1 (isometric to the hyperbolic plane). Namely: every holomorphic map from D to itself is distance-decreasing with respect to the Poincaré metric on D.

This is the beginning of a strong connection between complex analysis and the geometry of negative curvature. For any complex space X (for example a complex manifold), the Kobayashi pseudometric d_{X} is defined as the largest pseudometric on X such that

$$d_X(f(x),f(y)) \le \rho(x,y)$$,

for all holomorphic maps f from the unit disc D to X, where $\rho(x,y)$ denotes distance in the Poincaré metric on D. In a sense, this formula generalizes Schwarz's lemma to all complex spaces; but it may be vacuous in the sense that the Kobayashi pseudometric d_{X} may be identically zero. For example, it is identically zero when X is the complex line C. (This occurs because C contains arbitrarily big discs, the images of the holomorphic maps f_{a}: D → C given by f(z) = az for arbitrarily big positive numbers a.)

A complex space X is said to be Kobayashi hyperbolic if the Kobayashi pseudometric d_{X} is a metric, meaning that d_{X}(x,y) > 0 for all x ≠ y in X. Informally, this means that there is a genuine bound on the size of discs mapping holomorphically into X. In these terms, Schwarz's lemma says that the unit disc D is Kobayashi hyperbolic, and more precisely that the Kobayashi metric on D is exactly the Poincaré metric. The theory becomes more interesting as more examples of Kobayashi hyperbolic manifolds are found. (For a Kobayashi hyperbolic manifold X, the Kobayashi metric is a metric intrinsically determined by the complex structure of X; it is not at all clear that this should ever happen. A real manifold of positive dimension never has an intrinsic metric in this sense, because its diffeomorphism group is too big to allow that.)

== Examples ==
1. Every holomorphic map f: X → Y of complex spaces is distance-decreasing with respect to the Kobayashi pseudometrics of X and Y. It follows that if two points p and q in a complex space Y can be connected by a chain of holomorphic maps C → Y, then d_{Y}(p,q) = 0, using that d_{C} is identically zero. This gives many examples of complex manifolds for which the Kobayashi pseudometric is identically zero: the complex projective line CP^{1} or more generally complex projective space CP^{n}, C−{0} (using the exponential function C → C−{0}), an elliptic curve, or more generally a compact complex torus.
2. Kobayashi hyperbolicity is preserved under passage to open subsets or to closed complex subspaces. It follows, for example, that any bounded domain in C^{n} is hyperbolic.
3. A complex space is Kobayashi hyperbolic if and only if its universal covering space is Kobayashi hyperbolic. This gives many examples of hyperbolic complex curves, since the uniformization theorem shows that most complex curves (also called Riemann surfaces) have universal cover isomorphic to the disc D. In particular, every compact complex curve of genus at least 2 is hyperbolic, as is the complement of 2 or more points in C.

== Basic results ==
For a Kobayashi hyperbolic space X, every holomorphic map C → X is constant, by the distance-decreasing property of the Kobayashi pseudometric. This is often the most important consequence of hyperbolicity. For example, the fact that C minus 2 points is hyperbolic implies Picard's theorem that the image of any nonconstant entire function C → C misses at most one point of C. Nevanlinna theory is a more quantitative descendant of Picard's theorem.

Brody's theorem says that a compact complex space X is Kobayashi hyperbolic if and only if every holomorphic map C → X is constant. An application is that hyperbolicity is an open condition (in the Euclidean topology) for families of compact complex spaces. Mark Green used Brody's argument to characterize hyperbolicity for closed complex subspaces X of a compact complex torus: X is hyperbolic if and only if it contains no translate of a positive-dimensional subtorus.

If a complex manifold X has a Hermitian metric with holomorphic sectional curvature bounded above by a negative constant, then X is Kobayashi hyperbolic. In dimension 1, this is called the Ahlfors–Schwarz lemma.

== The Green–Griffiths–Lang conjecture ==
The results above give a complete description of which complex manifolds are Kobayashi hyperbolic in complex dimension 1. The picture is less clear in higher dimensions. A central open problem is the Green–Griffiths–Lang conjecture: if X is a complex projective variety of general type, then there should be a closed algebraic subset Y not equal to X such that every nonconstant holomorphic map C → X maps into Y.

Clemens and Voisin showed that for n at least 2, a very general hypersurface X in CP^{n+1} of degree d at least 2n+1 has the property that every closed subvariety of X is of general type. ("Very general" means that the property holds for all hypersurfaces of degree d outside a countable union of lower-dimensional algebraic subsets of the projective space of all such hypersurfaces.) As a result, the Green–Griffiths–Lang conjecture would imply that a very general hypersurface of degree at least 2n+1 is Kobayashi hyperbolic. Note that one cannot expect all smooth hypersurfaces of a given degree to be hyperbolic, for example because some hypersurfaces contain lines (isomorphic to CP^{1}). Such examples show the need for the subset Y in the Green–Griffiths–Lang conjecture.

The conjecture on hyperbolicity is known for hypersurfaces of high enough degree, thanks to a series of advances by Siu, Demailly and others, using the technique of jet differentials. For example, Diverio, Merker and Rousseau showed that a general hypersurface in CP^{n+1} of degree at least 2^{n^{5}} satisfies the Green-Griffiths-Lang conjecture. ("General" means that this holds for all hypersurfaces of given degree outside a finite union of lower-dimensional algebraic subsets of the projective space of all such hypersurfaces.) In 2016, Brotbek gave a proof of the Kobayashi conjecture for the hyperbolicity of general hypersurfaces of high degree, based on a use of Wronskian differential equations; explicit degree bounds have then been obtained in arbitrary dimension by Ya Deng and Demailly, e.g. [(en)^{2n+2}/3] by the latter. Better bounds for the degree are known in low dimensions.

McQuillan proved the Green–Griffiths–Lang conjecture for every complex projective surface of general type whose Chern numbers satisfy c_{1}^{2} > c_{2}. For an arbitrary variety X of general type, Demailly showed that every holomorphic map C→ X satisfies some (in fact, many) algebraic differential equations.

In the opposite direction, Kobayashi conjectured that the Kobayashi pseudometric is identically zero for Calabi–Yau manifolds. This is true in the case of K3 surfaces, using that every projective K3 surface is covered by a family of elliptic curves. More generally, Campana gave a precise conjecture about which complex projective varieties X have Kobayashi pseudometric equal to zero. Namely, this should be equivalent to X being special in the sense that X has no rational fibration over a positive-dimensional orbifold of general type.

== Analogy with number theory ==
For a projective variety X, the study of holomorphic maps C → X has some analogy with the study of rational points of X, a central topic of number theory. There are several conjectures on the relation between these two subjects. In particular, let X be a projective variety over a number field k. Fix an embedding of k into C. Then Lang conjectured that the complex manifold X(C) is Kobayashi hyperbolic if and only if X has only finitely many F-rational points for every finite extension field F of k. This is consistent with the known results on rational points, notably Faltings' theorem on subvarieties of abelian varieties.

More precisely, let X be a projective variety of general type over a number field k. Let the exceptional set Y be the Zariski closure of the union of the images of all nonconstant holomorphic maps C → X. According to the Green–Griffiths–Lang conjecture, Y should be a proper closed subset of X (and, in particular, not be equal to X). The strong Lang conjecture predicts that Y is defined over k and that X − Y has only finitely many F-rational points for every finite extension field F of k.

In the same spirit, for a projective variety X over a number field k (or, more generally, a finitely generated field k of characteristic zero), Campana conjectured that the Kobayashi pseudometric of X(C) is identically zero if and only if X has potentially dense rational points, meaning that there is a finite extension field F of k such that the set X(F) of F-rational points is Zariski dense in X.

== Variants ==
The Carathéodory metric is another intrinsic pseudometric on complex manifolds, based on holomorphic maps to the unit disc rather than from the unit disc. The Kobayashi infinitesimal pseudometric is a Finsler pseudometric whose associated distance function is the Kobayashi pseudometric as defined above. The Kobayashi–Eisenman pseudo-volume form is an intrinsic measure on a complex n-fold, based on holomorphic maps from the n-dimensional polydisc to X. It is understood better than the Kobayashi pseudometric. In particular, every projective variety of general type is measure-hyperbolic, meaning that the Kobayashi–Eisenman pseudo-volume form is positive outside a lower-dimensional algebraic subset.

Analogous pseudometrics have been considered for flat affine and projective structures, as well as for more general projective connections and conformal connections.
