= Song Sun =

Chinese mathematician (born 1987)

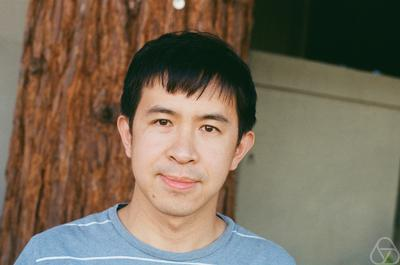
- Sun at Berkeley in 2022
- Born: 1987 (age 38–39); Huaining County, Anhui, China
- Education: University of Science and Technology of China (BS); University of Wisconsin–Madison (PhD)
- Awards: Oswald Veblen Prize in Geometry (2019)
- Scientific career
- Fields: Mathematics
- Workplaces: Imperial College London; Stony Brook University; University of California, Berkeley; Zhejiang University
- Thesis: Kempf–Ness theorem and uniqueness of extremal metrics
- Doctoral advisor: Xiuxiong Chen
- Website: https://sites.google.com/view/songsun

Song Sun (Chinese: 孙崧; pinyin: Sūn Sōng, born in 1987) is a Chinese mathematician whose research concerns geometry and topology. A Sloan Research Fellow, he was a professor in the Department of Mathematics of the University of California, Berkeley from 2018 until 2023. In 2019, he was awarded the Oswald Veblen Prize in Geometry. As of 2024, Sun is a professor at the Institute for Advanced Study in Mathematics (IASM), Zhejiang University.

== Biography ==
Sun attended Huaining High School in Huaining County, Anhui, China, before being admitted to the Special Class for the Gifted Young at the University of Science and Technology of China in 2002. After graduating from the program with a B.S. in 2006, he moved to the United States to pursue graduate studies at the University of Wisconsin, obtaining his Ph.D. in mathematics (differential geometry) in 2010. His doctoral advisor was Xiuxiong Chen, and his dissertation was titled "Kempf–Ness theorem and uniqueness of extremal metrics".

Sun worked as a research associate at Imperial College London before becoming an assistant professor at Stony Brook University in 2013. He was awarded the Sloan Research Fellowship in 2014. In 2018, he was appointed an associate professor at the Department of Mathematics of the University of California, Berkeley, where he was promoted to full professor in 2021.

He was an invited speaker at the 2018 International Congress of Mathematicians in Rio de Janeiro. In 2021, he was awarded the New Horizons Prize in Mathematics by the Breakthrough Prize Foundation, for many groundbreaking contributions to complex differential geometry, including existence results for Kähler-Einstein metrics and connections with moduli questions and singularities.

In January 2024, he returned to China and joined the Institute for Advanced Study in Mathematics (IASM) at Zhejiang University.

== Conjecture on Fano manifolds and Veblen Prize ==
In 2019, Sun was awarded the Oswald Veblen Prize in Geometry, together with his former advisor Xiuxiong Chen and English mathematician Simon Donaldson, for proving a long-standing conjecture on Fano manifolds, which states that "a Fano manifold admits a Kähler–Einstein metric if and only if it is K-stable". It had been one of the most actively investigated topics in geometry since a rough version of it was conjectured in the 1980s by Fields Medalist Shing-Tung Yau, who had previously proved the Calabi conjecture. The conjecture was later given a precise formulation by Donaldson, based in part on earlier work by Gang Tian. The solution found by Chen, Donaldson and Sun was published in the Journal of the American Mathematical Society in 2015 as a holistic three-article series, "Kähler–Einstein metrics on Fano manifolds, I, II and III".

== Major publications ==
- Donaldson, Simon; Sun, Song (2014). "Gromov-Hausdorff limits of Kähler manifolds and algebraic geometry". Acta Math. 213 (1): 63–106. arXiv:1206.2609. doi:10.1007/s11511-014-0116-3. S2CID 120450769.
- Chen, Xiuxiong; Donaldson, Simon; Sun, Song (2015). "Kähler-Einstein metrics on Fano manifolds. I: Approximation of metrics with cone singularities". J. Amer. Math. Soc. 28 (1): 183–197. arXiv:1211.4566. doi:10.1090/S0894-0347-2014-00799-2. S2CID 119641827.
- Chen, Xiuxiong; Donaldson, Simon; Sun, Song (2015). "Kähler-Einstein metrics on Fano manifolds. II: Limits with cone angle less than 2π". J. Amer. Math. Soc. 28 (1): 199–234. arXiv:1212.4714. doi:10.1090/S0894-0347-2014-00800-6. S2CID 119140033.
- Chen, Xiuxiong; Donaldson, Simon; Sun, Song (2015). "Kähler-Einstein metrics on Fano manifolds. III: Limits as cone angle approaches 2π and completion of the main proof". J. Amer. Math. Soc. 28 (1): 235–278. arXiv:1302.0282. doi:10.1090/S0894-0347-2014-00801-8. S2CID 119575364.
