= Constant scalar curvature Kähler metric =

In differential geometry, a constant scalar curvature Kähler metric (cscK metric) is a Kähler metric on a complex manifold whose scalar curvature is constant. A special case is a Kähler–Einstein metric, and a more general case is an extremal Kähler metric.

Donaldson (2002), Tian and Yau conjectured that the existence of a cscK metric on a polarised projective manifold is equivalent to the polarised manifold being K-polystable. Recent developments in the field suggest that the correct equivalence may be to the polarised manifold being uniformly K-polystable. When the polarisation is given by the (anti)-canonical line bundle (i.e. in the case of Fano or Calabi–Yau manifolds) the notions of K-stability and K-polystability coincide, cscK metrics are precisely Kähler-Einstein metrics and the Yau-Tian-Donaldson conjecture is known to hold.

== Extremal Kähler metrics ==
Constant scalar curvature Kähler metrics are specific examples of a more general notion of canonical metric on Kähler manifolds, extremal Kähler metrics. Extremal metrics, as the name suggests, extremise a certain functional on the space of Kähler metrics, the Calabi functional, introduced by Calabi.

=== Calabi functional ===
The Calabi functional is a functional defined on the space of Kähler potentials in a specific Kähler de Rham cohomology class on a compact Kähler manifold. Namely, let $[\omega]\in H_{\text{dR}}^2(X)$ be a Kähler class on a compact Kähler manifold $(X,\omega)$, and let $\omega_\varphi = \omega + i \partial \bar \partial \varphi$ be any Kähler metric in this class, which differs from $\omega$ by the potential $\varphi$. The Calabi functional $C$ is defined by

$$C(\omega_\varphi) = \int_X S(\omega_\varphi)^2 \omega_\varphi^n$$

where $S(\omega_\varphi)$ is the scalar curvature of the associated Riemannian metric to $\omega_\varphi$ and $\dim X = n$. This functional is essentially the norm squared of the scalar curvature for Kähler metrics in the Kähler class $[\omega]$. Understanding the flow of this functional, the Calabi flow, is a key goal in understanding the existence of canonical Kähler metrics.

=== Extremal metrics ===
By definition, an extremal Kähler metric is a critical point of the Calabi functional., either local or global minimizers. In this sense extremal Kähler metrics can be seen as the best or canonical choice of Kähler metric on any compact Kähler manifold.

Constant scalar curvature Kähler metrics are examples of extremal Kähler metrics which are absolute minimizers of the Calabi functional. In this sense the Calabi functional is similar to the Yang–Mills functional and extremal metrics are similar to Yang–Mills connections. The role of constant scalar curvature metrics are played by certain absolute minimizers of the Yang–Mills functional, anti-self dual connections or Hermitian Yang–Mills connections.

In some circumstances constant scalar curvature Kähler metrics may not exist on a compact Kähler manifold, but extremal metrics may still exist. For example, some manifolds may admit Kähler–Ricci solitons, which are examples of extremal Kähler metrics, and explicit extremal metrics can be constructed in the case of surfaces.

The absolute minimizers of the Calabi functional, the constant scalar curvature metrics, can be alternatively characterised as the critical points of another functional, the Mabuchi functional. This alternative variational perspective on constant scalar curvature metrics has better formal properties than the Calabi functional, due its relation to moment maps on the space of Kähler metrics.

=== Holomorphy potentials ===
There is an alternative characterization of the critical points of the Calabi functional in terms of so-called holomorphy potentials. Holomorphy potentials are certain smooth functions on a compact Kähler manifold whose Hamiltonian flow generate automorphisms of the Kähler manifold. In other words, their gradient vector fields are holomorphic.

A holomorphy potential is a complex-valued function $f: X\to \mathbb{C}$ such that the vector field $\xi$ defined by $\xi^j = g^{j\bar k} \partial_{\bar k} f$ is a holomorphic vector field, where $g$ is the Riemannian metric associated to the Kähler form, and summation here is taken with Einstein summation notation. The vector space of holomorphy potentials, denoted by $\mathfrak{h}$, can be identified with the Lie algebra of the automorphism group of the Kähler manifold $(X,\omega)$.

A Kähler metric $\omega$ is extremal, a minimizer of the Calabi functional, if and only if the scalar curvature $S(\omega)$ is a holomorphy potential. If the scalar curvature is constant so that $\omega$ is cscK, then the associated holomorphy potential is a constant function, and the induced holomorphic vector field is the zero vector field. In particular on a Kähler manifold which admits no non-zero holomorphic vector fields, the only holomorphy potentials are constant functions and every extremal metric is a constant scalar curvature Kähler metric.

The existence of constant curvature metrics are intimately linked to obstructions arising from holomorphic vector fields, which leads to the Futaki invariant and K-stability. This theory is well-studied for the specific case of Kähler–Einstein metrics.

== See also ==
- Mabuchi functional
- Kähler-Einstein metric
