= Kähler–Einstein metric =

Type of metric in Riemannian geometry

In differential geometry, a Kähler–Einstein metric on a complex manifold is a Riemannian metric that is both a Kähler metric and an Einstein metric. A manifold is said to be Kähler–Einstein if it admits a Kähler–Einstein metric. The most important special case of these are the Calabi–Yau manifolds, which are Kähler and Ricci-flat.

The most important problem for this area is the existence of Kähler–Einstein metrics for compact Kähler manifolds. This problem can be split up into three cases dependent on the sign of the first Chern class of the Kähler manifold:

- When the first Chern class is negative, there is always a Kähler–Einstein metric, as Thierry Aubin and Shing-Tung Yau proved independently.
- When the first Chern class is zero, there is always a Kähler–Einstein metric, as Yau proved in the Calabi conjecture. That leads to the name Calabi–Yau manifolds. He was awarded with the Fields Medal partly because of this work.
- The third case, the positive or Fano case, remained a well-known open problem for many years. In this case, there is a non-trivial obstruction to existence. In 2012, Xiuxiong Chen, Simon Donaldson, and Song Sun proved that in this case existence is equivalent to an algebro-geometric criterion called K-stability. Their proof appeared in a series of articles in the Journal of the American Mathematical Society. A proof was produced independently by Gang Tian at the same time.

When first Chern class is not definite, or we have intermediate Kodaira dimension, then finding canonical metric remained as an open problem, which is called the algebrization conjecture via analytical minimal model program.

== Definition ==
=== Einstein manifolds ===
Suppose $(X,g)$ is a Riemannian manifold. In physics the Einstein field equations are a set of partial differential equations on the metric tensor $g$ which describe how the manifold $X$ should curve due to the existence of mass or energy, a quantity encapsulated by the stress–energy tensor $T$. In a vacuum where there is no mass or energy, that is $T=0$, the Einstein Field Equations simplify. Namely, the Ricci curvature of $g$ is a symmetric $(2,0)$-tensor, as is the metric $g$ itself, and the equations reduce to

$$\operatorname{Ric}_g= \frac{1}{2}R_g g$$

where $R_g$ is the scalar curvature of $g$. That is, the Ricci curvature becomes proportional to the metric. A Riemannian manifold $(X,g)$ satisfying the above equation is called an Einstein manifold.

Every two-dimensional Riemannian manifold is Einstein. It can be proven using the Bianchi identities that, in any larger dimension, the scalar curvature of any connected Einstein manifold must be constant. For this reason, the Einstein condition is often given as

$$\operatorname{Ric}_g= \lambda g$$

for a real number $\lambda.$

=== Kähler manifolds ===
When the Riemannian manifold $(X,g)$ is also a complex manifold, that is it comes with an integrable almost-complex structure $J:TX\to TX$, it is possible to ask for a compatibility between the metric structure $g$ and the complex structure $J$. There are many equivalent ways of formulating this compatibility condition, and one succinct interpretation is to ask that $J$ is orthogonal with respect to $g$, so that $g(Ju,Jv)=g(u,v)$ for all vector fields $u,v\in \Gamma(TM)$, and that $J$ is preserved by the parallel transport of the Levi-Civita connection $\nabla$, captured by the condition $\nabla J = 0$. Such a triple $(X,g,J)$ is called a Kähler manifold.

=== Kähler–Einstein metrics ===
A Kähler–Einstein manifold is one which combines the above properties of being Kähler and admitting an Einstein metric. The combination of these properties implies a simplification of the Einstein equation in terms of the complex structure. Namely, on a Kähler manifold one can define the Ricci form, a real $(1,1)$-form, by the expression

$$\rho(u,v) = \operatorname{Ric}_g(Ju,v),$$

where $u,v$ are any tangent vector fields to $X$.

The almost-complex structure $J$ forces $\rho$ to be antisymmetric, and the compatibility condition $\nabla J = 0$ combined with the Bianchi identity implies that $\rho$ is a closed differential form. Associated to the Riemannian metric $g$ is the Kähler form $\omega$ defined by a similar expression $\omega(u,v)=g(Ju,v)$. Therefore the Einstein equations for $g$ can be rewritten as

$$\rho = \lambda \omega,$$

the Kähler–Einstein equation.

Since this is an equality of closed differential forms, it implies an equality of the associated de Rham cohomology classes $[\rho]$ and $[\omega]$. The former class is the first Chern class of $X$, $c_1(X)$. Therefore a necessary condition for the existence of a solution to the Kähler–Einstein equation is that $\lambda \omega \in c_1(X)$, for some $\lambda \in \mathbb{R}$. This is a topological necessary condition on the Kähler manifold $(X,g,J)$.

Note that since the Ricci curvature $\operatorname{Ric}_g$ is invariant under scaling $g\mapsto \lambda^{-1}g$, if there is a metric such that $\lambda \omega \in c_1(X)$, one can always normalise to a new metric with $\omega \in c_1(X)$, that is $\lambda = -1,0,1$. Thus the Kähler–Einstein equation is often written

$$\rho = -\omega, \quad \rho = 0,\quad \rho = \omega$$

depending on the sign of the topological constant $\lambda$.

== Transformation to a complex Monge–Ampere equation ==
The situation of compact Kähler manifolds is special, because the Kähler–Einstein equation can be reformulated as a complex Monge–Ampere equation for a smooth Kähler potential on $X$. By the topological assumption on the Kähler manifold, we may always assume that there exists some Kähler metric $\omega_0$ with $\lambda\omega_0\in c_1(X)$. The Ricci form $\rho_0$ of $\omega_0$ is given in local coordinates by the formula

$$\rho_0 = - i \partial \bar \partial \log \omega_0^n.$$

By assumption $\lambda\omega_0$ and $\rho_0$ are in the same cohomology class $c_1(X)$, so the $\partial \bar \partial$-lemma from Hodge theory implies there exists a smooth function $F\in C^{\infty}(X)$ such that $\lambda\omega_0 + i \partial \bar \partial F = \rho_0$.

Any other metric $\omega\in c_1(X)$ is related to $\omega_0$ by a Kähler potential $\varphi\in C^{\infty}(X)$ such that $\omega = \omega_0 + i \partial \bar \partial \varphi$. It then follows that if $\rho$ is the Ricci form with respect to $\omega$, then

$$\rho - \rho_0 = -i\partial \bar \partial \log \frac{\omega^n}{\omega_0^n}.$$

Thus to make $\rho=\lambda \omega$ we need to find $\varphi$ such that

$$\lambda i\partial \bar\partial \varphi = i \partial \bar \partial F - i \partial \bar \partial \log \frac{\omega^n}{\omega_0^n}.$$

This will certainly be true if the same equation is proven after removing the derivatives $\partial \bar \partial$, and in fact this is an equivalent equation by the $\partial \bar \partial$-lemma up to changing $\varphi$ by the addition of a constant function. In particular, after removing $\partial \bar \partial$ and exponentiating, the equation is transformed into

$$(\omega_0 + i \partial \bar \partial \varphi)^n = e^{F-\lambda \varphi} \omega_0^n.$$

This partial differential equation is similar to a real Monge–Ampere equation, and is known as a complex Monge–Ampere equation, and subsequently can be studied using tools from convex analysis. Its behaviour is highly sensitive to the sign of the topological constant $\lambda = -1,0,1$. The solutions of this equation appear as critical points of the K-energy functional introduced by Toshiki Mabuchi on the space of Kähler potentials in the class $c_1(X)$.

== Existence ==
The existence problem for Kähler–Einstein metrics can be split up into three distinct cases, dependent on the sign of the topological constant $\lambda$. Since the Kähler form $\omega$ is always a positive differential form, the sign of $\lambda$ depends on whether the cohomology class $c_1(X)$ is positive, negative, or zero. In algebraic geometry this is understood in terms of the canonical bundle of $X$: $c_1(X)<0$ if and only if the canonical bundle $K_X$ is an ample line bundle, and $c_1(X)>0$ if and only if $K_X^{-1}$ is ample. If $K_X$ is a trivial line bundle, then $c_1(X)=0$. When the Kähler manifold is compact, the problem of existence has been completely solved.

=== The case c_{1}(X)<0 ===
When the Kähler manifold $X$ satisfies the topological assumption $c_1(X)<0$, the canonical bundle is ample and so $\lambda$ must be negative. If the necessary topological assumption is satisfied, that is there exists a Kähler metric $\omega$ such that $c_1(X) = \lambda [\omega]$, then it was proven by Aubin and Yau that a Kähler–Einstein metric always exists. The existence of a Kähler metric satisfying the topological assumption is a consequence of Yau's proof of the Calabi conjecture.

Theorem (Aubin, Yau): A compact Kähler manifold with $c_1(X)<0$ always admits a Kähler–Einstein metric.

=== The case c_{1}(X)=0 ===
When the canonical bundle $K_X$ is trivial, so that $c_1(X)=0$, the manifold is said to be Calabi–Yau. These manifolds are of special significance in physics, where they should appear as the string background in superstring theory in 10 dimensions. Mathematically, this corresponds to the case where $\lambda = 0$, that is, when the Riemannian manifold $(X,g)$ is Ricci flat.

The existence of a Kähler–Einstein metric was proven in this case by Yau, using a continuity method similar to the case where $c_1(X)<0$. The topological assumption $c_1(X)=0$ introduces new difficulties into the continuity method. Partly due to his proof of existence, and the related proof of the Calabi conjecture, Yau was awarded the Fields Medal.

Theorem (Yau): A compact Kähler manifold with trivial canonical bundle, a Calabi–Yau manifold, always admits a Kähler–Einstein metric, and in particular admits a Ricci-flat metric.

=== The case c_{1}(X)>0 ===
When the anticanonical bundle $K_X^{-1}$ is ample, or equivalently $c_1(X)>0$, the manifold is said to be Fano. In contrast to the case $c_1(X)\le 0$, a Kähler–Einstein metric does not always exist in this case. It was observed by Akito Futaki that there are possible obstructions to the existence of a solution given by the holomorphic vector fields of $X$, and it is a necessary condition that the Futaki invariant of these vector fields is non-negative. Indeed, much earlier it had been observed by Matsushima and Lichnerowicz that another necessary condition is that the Lie algebra of holomorphic vector fields $H^0(X,TX)$ must be reductive.

It was conjectured by Yau in 1993, in analogy with the similar problem of existence of Hermite–Einstein metrics on holomorphic vector bundles, that the obstruction to existence of a Kähler–Einstein metric should be equivalent to a certain algebro-geometric stability condition similar to slope stability of vector bundles. In 1997 Tian Gang proposed a possible stability condition, which came to be known as K-stability.

The conjecture of Yau was resolved in 2012 by Chen–Donaldson–Sun using techniques largely different from the classical continuity method of the case $c_1(X)\le 0$, and at the same time by Tian. Chen–Donaldson–Sun have disputed Tian's proof, claiming that it contains mathematical inaccuracies and material which should be attributed to them. (Note: Xiuxiong Chen, Simon Donaldson, Song Sun. "On some recent developments in Kähler geometry.") Tian has disputed these claims. (Note: Gang Tian. "Response to CDS" and "More comments on CDS.", Corrigendum: K-Stability and Kähler‐Einstein Metrics) The 2019 Veblen prize was awarded to Chen–Donaldson–Sun for their proof. Donaldson was awarded the 2015 Breakthrough Prize in Mathematics in part for his contribution to the proof, and the 2021 New Horizons Breakthrough Prize was awarded to Sun in part for his contribution.

Theorem: A compact Fano manifold $X$ admits a Kähler–Einstein metric if and only if the pair $(X,K_X^{-1})$ is K-polystable.

A proof based along the lines of the continuity method which resolved the case $c_1(X)\le 0$ was later provided by Datar–Székelyhidi, and several other proofs are now known. See the Yau–Tian–Donaldson conjecture for more details.

== Kähler–Ricci flow and the minimal model program ==
A central program in birational geometry is the minimal model program, which seeks to generate models of algebraic varieties inside every birationality class, which are in some sense minimal, usually in that they minimize certain measures of complexity (such as the arithmetic genus in the case of curves). In higher dimensions, one seeks a minimal model which has nef canonical bundle. One way to construct minimal models is to contract certain curves $C\subset X$ inside an algebraic variety $X$ which have negative self-intersection. These curves should be thought of geometrically as subvarieties on which $X$ has a concentration of negative curvature.

In this sense, the minimal model program can be viewed as an analogy of the Ricci flow in differential geometry, where regions where curvature concentrate are expanded or contracted in order to reduce the original Riemannian manifold to one with uniform curvature (precisely, to a new Riemannian manifold which has uniform Ricci curvature, which is to say an Einstein manifold). In the case of 3-manifolds, this was famously used by Grigori Perelman to prove the Poincaré conjecture.

In the setting of Kähler manifolds, the Kähler–Ricci flow was first written down by Cao. Here one fixes a Kähler metric $g_{i\bar j}$ with Ricci form $\rho_{i\bar j}$, and studies the geometric flow for a family of Kähler metrics $\tilde{g}_{ij}(t)$ parametrised by $t\in [0,\infty)$:

$$\frac{\partial \tilde{g}_{i\bar j}}{\partial t} = -\tilde{\rho}_{i\bar j} + \rho_{i\bar j},\quad \tilde{g}_{i\bar j}(0) = g_{i\bar j}.$$

When a projective variety $X$ is of general type, the minimal model $X'$ admits a further simplification to a canonical model $X''$, with ample canonical bundle. In settings where there are only mild (orbifold) singularities to this canonical model, it is possible to ask whether the Kähler–Ricci flow of $X$ converges to a (possibly mildly singular) Kähler–Einstein metric on $X''$, which should exist by Yau and Aubin's existence result for $c_1(X'')<0$.

A precise result along these lines was proven by Cascini and La Nave, and around the same time by Tian–Zhang.

Theorem: The Kähler–Ricci flow on a projective variety $X$ of general type exists for all time, and after at most a finite number of singularity formations, if the canonical model $X''$ of $X$ has at worst orbifold singularities, then the Kähler–Ricci flow on $X$ converges to the Kähler–Einstein metric on $X''$, up to a bounded function which is smooth away from an analytic subvariety of $X$.

In the case where the variety $X$ is of dimension two, so is a surface of general type, one gets convergence to the Kähler–Einstein metric on $X''$.

Later, Jian Song and Tian studied the case where the projective variety $X$ has log-terminal singularities.

=== Kähler–Ricci flow and existence of Kähler–Einstein metrics ===
It is possible to give an alternative proof of the Chen–Donaldson–Sun theorem on existence of Kähler–Einstein metrics on a smooth Fano manifold using the Kähler-Ricci flow, and this was carried out in 2018 by Chen–Sun–Wang. Namely, if the Fano manifold is K-polystable, then the Kähler-Ricci flow exists for all time and converges to a Kähler–Einstein metric on the Fano manifold.

== Generalizations and alternative notions ==
=== Constant scalar curvature Kähler metrics ===
When the canonical bundle $K_X$ is not trivial, ample, or anti-ample, it is not possible to ask for a Kähler–Einstein metric, as the class $c_1(X)$ cannot contain a Kähler metric, and so the necessary topological condition can never be satisfied. This follows from the Kodaira embedding theorem.

A natural generalisation of the Kähler–Einstein equation to the more general setting of an arbitrary compact Kähler manifold is to ask that the Kähler metric has constant scalar curvature (one says the metric is cscK). The scalar curvature is the total trace of the Riemannian curvature tensor, a smooth function on the manifold $(X,g)$, and in the Kähler case the condition that the scalar curvature is constant admits a transformation into an equation similar to the complex Monge–Ampere equation of the Kähler–Einstein setting. Many techniques from the Kähler–Einstein case carry on to the cscK setting, albeit with added difficulty, and it is conjectured that a similar algebro-geometric stability condition should imply the existence of solutions to the equation in this more general setting.

When the compact Kähler manifold satisfies the topological assumptions necessary for the Kähler–Einstein condition to make sense, the constant scalar curvature Kähler equation reduces to the Kähler–Einstein equation.

=== Hermite–Einstein metrics ===
Instead of asking the Ricci curvature of the Levi-Civita connection on the tangent bundle of a Kähler manifold $X$ is proportional to the metric itself, one can instead ask this question for the curvature of a Chern connection associated to a Hermitian metric on any holomorphic vector bundle over $X$ (note that the Levi-Civita connection on the holomorphic tangent bundle is precisely the Chern connection of the Hermitian metric coming from the Kähler structure). The resulting equation is called the Hermite–Einstein equation, and is of special importance in gauge theory, where it appears as a special case of the Yang–Mills equations, which come from quantum field theory, in contrast to the regular Einstein equations which come from general relativity.

In the case where the holomorphic vector bundle is again the holomorphic tangent bundle and the Hermitian metric is the Kähler metric, the Hermite–Einstein equation reduces to the Kähler–Einstein equation. In general however, the geometry of the Kähler manifold is often fixed and only the bundle metric is allowed to vary, and this causes the Hermite–Einstein equation to be easier to study than the Kähler–Einstein equation in general. In particular, a complete algebro-geometric characterisation of the existence of solutions is given by the Kobayashi–Hitchin correspondence.

== Literature ==
- Huybrechts, Daniel (2004-11-18). Complex geometry: An introduction. Universitext. Springer Science+Business Media. ISBN 978-3540212904.
- Moroianu, Andrei (2007). Lectures on Kähler Geometry. London Mathematical Society Student Texts. Vol. 69. Cambridge. ISBN 978-0-521-68897-0.
