= Kähler manifold =

Manifold with Riemannian, complex and symplectic structure

In mathematics and especially differential geometry, a Kähler manifold is a manifold with three mutually compatible structures: a complex structure, a Riemannian structure, and a symplectic structure. The concept was first studied by Jan Arnoldus Schouten and David van Dantzig in 1930, and then introduced by Erich Kähler in 1933. The terminology has been fixed by André Weil. Kähler geometry refers to the study of Kähler manifolds, their geometry and topology, as well as the study of structures and constructions that can be performed on Kähler manifolds, for example the existence of special connections such as Hermitian Yang–Mills connections, or special metrics such as Kähler–Einstein metrics.

Every smooth complex projective variety is a Kähler manifold. Hodge theory is a central part of algebraic geometry, proved using Kähler metrics.

== Definitions ==
Since Kähler manifolds are equipped with several compatible structures, they can be described from different points of view. The equivalence of these points of view essentially comes from the fact that the unitary group $\mathrm{U}(n)$ is the intersection of any two groups among $\mathrm{GL}_n(\C), \mathrm{Sp}(2n,\R)$ and $\mathrm{O}(2n)$.

=== Symplectic viewpoint ===
A Kähler manifold is a symplectic manifold $(X,\omega)$ equipped with an integrable almost-complex structure $J$ which is compatible with the symplectic form $\omega$, meaning that the bilinear form

$$g(u,v)=\omega(u,Jv)$$

on the tangent space of $X$ at each point is symmetric and positive definite (and hence a Riemannian metric on $X$). The odd-dimensional counterpart for contact manifolds is a Sasakian manifold.

=== Complex viewpoint ===
A Kähler manifold is a complex manifold $X$ with a Hermitian metric $h$ whose associated 2-form $\omega$ is closed. In more detail, $h$ gives a positive definite Hermitian form on the tangent space $TX$ at each point of $X$, and the 2-form $\omega$ is defined by

$$\omega(u,v)=\operatorname{Re} h(iu,v) = \operatorname{Im} h(u, v)$$

for tangent vectors $u$ and $v$ (where $i$ is the complex number $\sqrt{-1}$). For a Kähler manifold $X$, the Kähler form $\omega$ is a real closed (1,1)-form. A Kähler manifold can also be viewed as a Riemannian manifold, with the Riemannian metric $g$ defined by

$$g(u,v)=\operatorname{Re} h(u,v).$$

Equivalently, a Kähler manifold $X$ is a Hermitian manifold of complex dimension $n$ such that for every point $p$ of $X$, there is a holomorphic coordinate chart around $p$ in which the metric agrees with the standard metric on $\mathbb{C}^n$ to order 2 near $p$. That is, if the chart takes $p$ to $0$ in $\mathbb{C}^n$, and the metric is written in these coordinates as $h_{ab}=\left(\frac{\partial}{\partial z_a}, \frac{\partial}{\partial z_b}\right)$, then

$$h_{ab}=\delta_{ab}+O(\|z\|^2)$$

for all $a$, $b$ $\in \{1,\cdots, n\}$

Since the 2-form $\omega$ is closed, it determines an element in de Rham cohomology $H^2(X,\mathbb{R})$, known as the Kähler class.

=== Riemannian viewpoint ===
A Kähler manifold is a Riemannian manifold $X$ of even dimension $2n$ whose holonomy group is contained in the unitary group $\operatorname{U}(n)$. Equivalently, there is a complex structure $J$ on the tangent space of $X$ at each point (that is, a real linear map from $TX$ to itself with $J^2=-1$) such that $J$ preserves the metric $g$ (meaning that $g(Ju,Jv)=g(u,v)$) and $J$ is preserved by parallel transport.

The symplectic form $\omega$ is then defined by $g(u,v)=\omega(u,Jv)$, which is closed since $J$ is preserved by parallel transport.

== Examples ==
1. Complex space $\C^n$ with the standard Hermitian metric is a Kähler manifold.
2. A compact complex torus $\C/\Lambda$ with $\Lambda$ a full lattice inherits a flat metric from the Euclidean metric on $\C^n$, and is therefore a compact Kähler manifold.
3. Every Riemannian metric on an oriented 2-manifold is Kähler. (Indeed, its holonomy group is contained in the rotation group $\mathrm{SO}(2)$, which is equal to the unitary group $\mathrm{U}(1)$.) In particular, an oriented Riemannian 2-manifold is a Riemann surface in a canonical way; this is known as the existence of isothermal coordinates. Conversely, every Riemann surface is Kähler since the Kähler form of any Hermitian metric is closed for dimensional reasons.
4. There is a standard choice of Kähler metric on complex projective space $\mathbb{CP}^n$, the Fubini–Study metric. One description involves the unitary group $\mathrm{U}(n+1)$, the group of linear automorphisms of $\C^{n+1}$ that preserve the standard Hermitian form. The Fubini–Study metric is the unique Riemannian metric on $\mathbb{CP}^n$ (up to a positive multiple) that is invariant under the action of $\mathrm{U}(n+1)$ on $\mathbb{CP}^n$. One natural generalization of $\mathbb{CP}^n$ is provided by the Hermitian symmetric spaces of compact type, such as Grassmannians. The natural Kähler metric on a Hermitian symmetric space of compact type has nonnegative sectional curvature.
5. The induced metric on a complex submanifold of a Kähler manifold is Kähler. In particular, any open subset of $\C^n$, any Stein manifold (embedded in $\mathbb{C}^n$) or any smooth projective algebraic variety (embedded in $\mathbb{CP}^n$) is Kähler. This provides a large class of examples.
6. The open unit ball $\mathbb{B}^n$ in $\C^n$ has a complete Kähler metric called the Bergman metric, with holomorphic sectional curvature equal to −1. A natural generalization of the ball is provided by the Hermitian symmetric spaces of noncompact type, such as the Siegel upper half space. Every Hermitian symmetric space $X$ of noncompact type is biholomorphic to a bounded domain in some $\C^n$, and the Bergman metric of $X$ is a complete Kähler metric with nonpositive sectional curvature.
7. Every K3 surface is Kähler (by Siu).

== Kähler potential ==
A smooth real-valued function $\rho$ on a complex manifold is called strictly plurisubharmonic if the real closed (1,1)-form

$$\omega = \frac i2 \partial \bar\partial \rho$$

is positive, that is, a Kähler form. Here $\partial, \bar\partial$ are the Dolbeault operators. The function $\rho$ is called a Kähler potential for $\omega$.

Conversely, by the complex version of the Poincaré lemma, known as the local $\partial \bar \partial$-lemma, every Kähler metric can locally be described in this way. That is, if $(X,\omega)$ is a Kähler manifold, then for every point $p$ in $X$ there is a neighborhood $U$ of $p$ and a smooth real-valued function $\rho$ on $U$ such that ${\omega\vert}_U=(i/2)\partial\bar\partial \rho$. Here $\rho$ is called a local Kähler potential for $\omega$. There is no comparable way of describing a general Riemannian metric in terms of a single function.

=== Space of Kähler potentials ===
Whilst it is not always possible to describe a Kähler form globally using a single Kähler potential, it is possible to describe the difference of two Kähler forms this way, provided they are in the same de Rham cohomology class. This is a consequence of the $\partial \bar \partial$-lemma from Hodge theory.

Namely, if $(X,\omega)$ is a compact Kähler manifold, then the cohomology class $[\omega]\in H_{\text{dR}}^2(X)$ is called a Kähler class. Any other representative of this class, $\omega'$ say, differs from $\omega$ by $\omega' = \omega + d\beta$ for some one-form $\beta$. The $\partial \bar \partial$-lemma further states that this exact form $d\beta$ may be written as $d\beta = i \partial \bar \partial \varphi$ for a smooth function $\varphi: X\to \mathbb{C}$. In the local discussion above, one takes the local Kähler class $[\omega]=0$ on an open subset $U\subset X$, and by the Poincaré lemma any Kähler form will locally be cohomologous to zero. Thus the local Kähler potential $\rho$ is the same $\varphi$ for $[\omega]=0$ locally.

In general if $[\omega]$ is a Kähler class, then any other Kähler metric can be written as $\omega_\varphi = \omega + i \partial \bar \partial \varphi$ for such a smooth function. This form is not automatically a positive form, so the space of Kähler potentials for the class $[\omega]$ is defined as those positive cases, and is commonly denoted by $\mathcal{K}$:

$$\mathcal{K}_{[\omega]} := \{ \varphi: X \to \mathbb{R} \text{ smooth} \mid \omega + i \partial \bar \partial \varphi>0 \}.$$

If two Kähler potentials differ by a constant, then they define the same Kähler metric, so the space of Kähler metrics in the class $[\omega]$ can be identified with the quotient $\mathcal{K}/\mathbb{R}$. The space of Kähler potentials is a contractible space. In this way the space of Kähler potentials allows one to study all Kähler metrics in a given class simultaneously, and this perspective in the study of existence results for Kähler metrics.

== Kähler manifolds and volume minimizers ==
On a Kähler manifold $(X,\omega)$ of dimension $n$, the volume form $\frac{\omega^n}{n!}$ associated with the symplectic-form $\omega$ is also the Riemannian volume form of the metric $g=\mathrm{Re}(\omega)$.

A specific feature of compact Kähler manifolds is the fact that the volume of a closed complex subspace of $Y$ is determined by its fundamental class $[Y]$ viewed in $H_*(X,\Z)$. In a sense, this means that the geometry of a complex subspace is bounded in terms of its topology. (This fails completely for real submanifolds.) Explicitly, Wirtinger's formula says that

$$\mathrm{vol}(Y)=\frac{1}{r!}\int_Y \omega^r$$

where $Y$ is an r-dimensional closed complex subspace and $\omega$ is the Kähler form. Since $\omega$ is closed, this integral depends only on the fundamental class of $Y$ in $H_{2r}(X,\R)$ and can be expressed as

$$\mathrm{vol}(Y)=\frac{1}{r!}[\omega]^r\cdot [Y]$$.

These volumes are always positive, which expresses a strong positivity of the Kähler class $\omega$ in $H^2(X,\R)$ with respect to complex subspaces. In particular, $\omega^n \ne 0$ for a compact Kähler manifold $X$ of complex dimension $n\ge 1$.

A related fact is that every closed complex subspace $Y$ of a compact Kähler manifold $X$ is a minimal submanifold (outside its singular set). Even more: by the theory of calibrated geometry, $Y$ minimizes volume among all (real) cycles in the same homology class.

== Kähler identities ==
As a consequence of the strong interaction between the smooth, complex, and Riemannian structures on a Kähler manifold, there are natural identities between the various operators on the complex differential forms of Kähler manifolds which do not hold for arbitrary complex manifolds. These identities relate the exterior derivative $d$, the Dolbeault operators $\partial, \bar \partial$ and their adjoints, the Laplacians $\Delta_d, \Delta_{\partial}, \Delta_{\bar \partial}$, and the Lefschetz operator $L := \omega \wedge -$ and its adjoint, the contraction operator $\Lambda = L^*$. The identities form the basis of the analytical toolkit on Kähler manifolds, and combined with Hodge theory are fundamental in proving many important properties of Kähler manifolds and their cohomology. In particular the Kähler identities are critical in proving the Kodaira and Nakano vanishing theorems, the Lefschetz hyperplane theorem, Hard Lefschetz theorem, Hodge-Riemann bilinear relations, and Hodge index theorem.

== The Laplacian on a Kähler manifold ==
On a Riemannian manifold of dimension $n$, the Laplacian on smooth $r$-forms is defined by $\Delta_d=dd^*+d^*d$ where $d$ is the exterior derivative and $d^*=-(-1)^{n(r+1)}\star d\, \star$, where $\star$ is the Hodge star operator. (Equivalently, $d^*$ is the adjoint of $d$ with respect to the L^{2} inner product on $r$-forms with compact support.) For a Hermitian manifold $X$, $d$ and $d^*$ are decomposed as

$$d=\partial+\bar{\partial},\ \ \ \ d^*=\partial^*+\bar{\partial}^*,$$

and two other Laplacians are defined:

$$\Delta_{\bar{\partial}}=\bar{\partial}\bar{\partial}^*+\bar{\partial}^*\bar{\partial},\ \ \ \ \Delta_\partial=\partial\partial^*+\partial^*\partial.$$

If $X$ is Kähler, the Kähler identities imply these Laplacians are all the same up to a constant:

$$\Delta_d=2\Delta_{\bar{\partial}}=2\Delta_\partial .$$

These identities imply that on a Kähler manifold $X$,

$$\mathcal H^r(X)=\bigoplus_{p+q=r}\mathcal H^{p,q}(X),$$

where $\mathcal H^r$ is the space of harmonic $r$-forms on $X$ (forms $\alpha$ with $\Delta\alpha=0$) and $\mathcal H^{p,q}$ is the space of harmonic $(p,q)$-forms. That is, a differential form $\alpha$ is harmonic if and only if each of its $(p,q)$-components is harmonic.

Further, for a compact Kähler manifold $X$, every cohomology class in de Rham or in Dolbeault cohomology contains a unique harmonic representant. The decomposition of harmonic forms into (p,q)-components therefore gives rise to the Hodge decomposition

$$H^r(X,\R)=\bigoplus_{p+q=r}H^{p,q}(X,\C).$$

Hodge theory gives moreover an interpretation of this splitting which does not depend on the choice of Kähler metric. Namely, the cohomology $H^r(X,\mathbf{C})$ of $X$ with complex coefficients splits as a direct sum of certain coherent sheaf cohomology groups:

$$H^r(X,\mathbf{C})\cong\bigoplus_{p+q=r}H^q(X,\Omega^p).$$

The group on the left depends only on $X$ as a topological space, while the groups on the right depend on $X$ as a complex manifold. So this Hodge decomposition theorem connects topology and complex geometry for compact Kähler manifolds.

Alternatively, the Hodge decomposition can be shown to be independent of the Kähler metric by using Bott-Chern cohomology.

Let $H^{p,q}(X)$ be the complex vector space $H^q(X,\Omega^p)$, which can be identified with the space $\mathcal H^{p,q}(X)$ of harmonic forms with respect to a given Kähler metric. The Hodge numbers of $X$ are defined by $h^{p,q}(X)=\mathrm{dim}_{\mathbf{C}}H^{p,q}(X)$. The Hodge decomposition implies a decomposition of the Betti numbers of a compact Kähler manifold $X$ in terms of its Hodge numbers:

$$b_r=\sum_{p+q=r}h^{p,q}.$$

The Hodge numbers of a compact Kähler manifold satisfy several identities. The Hodge symmetry $h^{p,q}=h^{q,p}$ holds because the Laplacian $\Delta_d$ is a real operator, and so $H^{p,q}=\overline{H^{q,p}}$. The identity $h^{p,q}=h^{n-p,n-q}$ can be proved using that the Hodge star operator gives an isomorphism $H^{p,q}\cong \overline{H^{n-p,n-q}}$. It also follows from Serre duality.

== Topology of compact Kähler manifolds ==
A simple consequence of Hodge theory is that every odd Betti number $b_{2a+1}$ of a compact Kähler manifold is even, by Hodge symmetry. This is not true for compact complex manifolds in general, as shown by the example of the Hopf surface, which is diffeomorphic to $\mathbb{S}^1\times\mathbb{S}^3$ and hence has $b_1=1$.

The "Kähler package" is a collection of further restrictions on the cohomology of compact Kähler manifolds, building on Hodge theory. The results include the Lefschetz hyperplane theorem, the hard Lefschetz theorem, and the Hodge-Riemann bilinear relations. A related result is that every compact Kähler manifold is formal in the sense of rational homotopy theory.

The question of which groups can be fundamental groups of compact Kähler manifolds, called Kähler groups, is wide open. Hodge theory gives many restrictions on the possible Kähler groups. The simplest restriction is that the abelianization of a Kähler group must have even rank, since the Betti number $b_1$ of a compact Kähler manifold is even. (For example, the integers $\Z$ is not the fundamental group of a compact Kähler manifold.) Extensions of the theory such as non-abelian Hodge theory give further restrictions on which groups can be Kähler groups.

Without the Kähler condition, the situation is simple: Clifford Taubes showed that every finitely presented group arises as the fundamental group of some compact complex manifold of dimension 3. (Conversely, the fundamental group of any closed manifold is finitely presented.)

== Characterizations of complex projective varieties and compact Kähler manifolds ==
The Kodaira embedding theorem characterizes smooth complex projective varieties among all compact Kähler manifolds. Namely, a compact complex manifold $X$ is projective if and only if there is a Kähler form $\omega$ on $X$ whose class in $H^2(X,\R)$ is in the image of the integral cohomology group $H^2(X,\Z)$. (Because a positive multiple of a Kähler form is a Kähler form, it is equivalent to say that $X$ has a Kähler form whose class in $H^2(X,\R)$ comes from $H^2(X,\Q)$.) Equivalently, $X$ is projective if and only if there is a holomorphic line bundle $L$ on $X$ with a hermitian metric whose curvature form $\Theta$ is positive (since $\frac{i}{2\pi}\Theta$ is then a Kähler form that represents the first Chern class of $L$ in $H^2(X,\Z)$. Any Kähler form $\omega$ whose class in $H^2(X,\R)$ belongs to $H^2(X,\Z)$ is called a Hodge form on $X$, and the Riemannian metric associated with $\omega$ is called a Hodge metric. A compact Kähler manifold endowed with a Hodge metric is called a Hodge manifold.

Many properties of Kähler manifolds hold in the slightly greater generality of $\partial \bar \partial$-manifolds, that is compact complex manifolds for which the $\partial \bar \partial$-lemma holds. In particular the Bott–Chern cohomology is an alternative to the Dolbeault cohomology of a compact complex manifolds, and they are isomorphic if and only if the manifold satisfies the $\partial \bar \partial$-lemma, and in particular agree when the manifold is Kähler. In general the kernel of the natural map from Bott–Chern cohomology to Dolbeault cohomology contains information about the failure of the manifold to be Kähler.

Every compact complex curve is projective, but in complex dimension at least 2, there are many compact Kähler manifolds that are not projective; for example, most compact complex tori are not projective. One may ask whether every compact Kähler manifold can at least be deformed (by continuously varying the complex structure) to a smooth projective variety. Kunihiko Kodaira's work on the classification of surfaces implies that every compact Kähler manifold of complex dimension 2 can indeed be deformed to a smooth projective variety. Claire Voisin found, however, that this fails in dimensions at least 4. She constructed a compact Kähler manifold of complex dimension 4 that is not even homotopy equivalent to any smooth complex projective variety.

One can also ask for a characterization of compact Kähler manifolds among all compact complex manifolds. In complex dimension 2, Kodaira and Yum-Tong Siu showed that a compact complex surface has a Kähler metric if and only if its first Betti number is even. An alternative proof of this result which does not require the hard case-by-case study using the classification of compact complex surfaces was provided independently by Buchdahl and Lamari. Thus "Kähler" is a purely topological property for compact complex surfaces. Hironaka's example shows, however, that this fails in dimensions at least 3. In more detail, the example is a 1-parameter family of smooth compact complex 3-folds such that most fibers are Kähler (and even projective), but one fiber is not Kähler. Thus a compact Kähler manifold can be diffeomorphic to a non-Kähler complex manifold.

== Kähler–Einstein manifolds ==
A Kähler manifold is called Kähler–Einstein if it has constant Ricci curvature. Equivalently, the Ricci curvature tensor is equal to a constant $\lambda$ times the metric tensor, $\mathrm{Ric} =\lambda g$. The reference to Einstein comes from general relativity, which asserts in the absence of matter that spacetime is a 4-dimensional Lorentzian manifold with zero Ricci curvature. See the article on Einstein manifolds for more details.

Although Ricci curvature is defined for any Riemannian manifold, it plays a special role in Kähler geometry: the Ricci curvature of a Kähler manifold $X$ can be viewed as a real closed (1,1)-form that represents the first Chern class of the tangent bundle of $X$ in $H^2(X,\R)$. It follows that the canonical bundle of a compact Kähler–Einstein manifold $X$ is either anti-ample, homologically trivial, or ample, depending on whether the constant $\lambda$ is positive, zero, or negative. Compact Kähler manifolds of those three types are called Fano, Calabi–Yau, or with ample canonical bundle (which implies general type), respectively. By the Kodaira embedding theorem, Fano manifolds and manifolds with ample canonical bundle are automatically projective varieties.

Shing-Tung Yau proved the Calabi conjecture: every smooth projective variety with ample canonical bundle has a Kähler–Einstein metric (with constant negative Ricci curvature), and every Calabi–Yau manifold has a Kähler–Einstein metric (with zero Ricci curvature). These results are important for the classification of algebraic varieties, with applications such as the Miyaoka–Yau inequality for varieties with ample canonical bundle and the Beauville–Bogomolov decomposition for Calabi–Yau manifolds.

By contrast, not every smooth Fano variety has a Kähler–Einstein metric (which would have constant positive Ricci curvature). However, Xiuxiong Chen, Simon Donaldson, and Song Sun proved the Yau–Tian–Donaldson conjecture: a smooth Fano variety has a Kähler–Einstein metric if and only if it is K-stable, a purely algebro-geometric condition.

In situations where there cannot exist a Kähler–Einstein metric, it is possible to study mild generalizations including constant scalar curvature Kähler metrics and extremal Kähler metrics. When a Kähler–Einstein metric can exist, these broader generalizations are automatically Kähler–Einstein.

== Kähler manifolds of constant curvature ==
=== Holomorphic sectional curvature ===
The deviation of a Riemannian manifold $X$ from the standard metric on Euclidean space is measured by sectional curvature, which is a real number associated to any real 2-plane in the tangent space of $X$ at a point. For a Hermitian manifold (for example, a Kähler manifold), the holomorphic sectional curvature is defined as the sectional curvature restricted to complex lines in the tangent space.

On a Kähler manifold, the holomorphic sectional curvature completely determines the sectional curvature, and hence the curvature tensor.

The holomorphic sectional curvature is intimately related to the complex geometry of the underlying complex manifold. It is an elementary consequence of the Ahlfors Schwarz lemma that if $(X,\omega)$ is a Hermitian manifold with a Hermitian metric of negative holomorphic sectional curvature (bounded above by a negative constant), then it is Brody hyperbolic (i.e., every holomorphic map $\mathbb{C}\to X$ is constant). If $X$ happens to be compact, then this is equivalent to the manifold being Kobayashi hyperbolic.

On the other hand, if $(X,\omega)$ is a compact Kähler manifold with a Kähler metric of positive holomorphic sectional curvature, Yang Xiaokui showed that $X$ is rationally connected.

A remarkable feature of complex geometry is that holomorphic sectional curvature decreases on complex submanifolds. (The same goes for a more general concept, holomorphic bisectional curvature.) For example, every complex submanifold of $\C^n$ (with the induced metric from $\C^n$) has nonpositive holomorphic sectional curvature.

For holomorphic maps between Hermitian manifolds, the holomorphic sectional curvature is not strong enough to control the target curvature term appearing in the Schwarz lemma second-order estimate. This motivated the consideration of the real bisectional curvature, introduced by Xiaokui Yang and Fangyang Zheng. This also appears in the work of Man-Chun Lee and Jeffrey Streets under the name complex curvature operator.

=== Kähler manifolds of constant holomorphic sectional curvature ===
The only complete simply-connected Kähler manifolds of constant curvature are $\mathbb{CP}^n,\C^n$, and the unit ball in $\C^n$.

- On $\mathbb{CP}^n$, the sectional curvature of the Fubini-Study metric (for $n\ge 2$) varies between 1/4 and 1 at every point, while this space has constant holomorphic sectional curvature equal to 1.
- On $\C^n$, the Euclidean metric is a Kähler metric of constant Riemannian, and hence holomorphic sectional curvature, equal to 0.
- On the open unit ball in $\C^n$, there is a complete Kähler metric of constant holomorphic sectional curvature equal to $-1$, called the complex hyperbolic metric, whose Riemannian sectional curvature varies between $-1/4$ and $-1$. (Note: Some authors choose another curvature convention, for which the holomorphic sectional curvature is constant equal to −4.) Up to a constant, this metric coincides with the Bergman metric, the Koyabashi metric, and it makes the ball a Hermitian symmetric space of noncompact type.

As a consequence, any complete Kähler manifold of constant holomorphic sectional curvature is holomorphically isometric to a non-singular quotient of one of these 3 model spaces.

== See also ==
- Almost complex manifold
- Hyperkähler manifold
- Quaternion-Kähler manifold
- K-energy functional

== Sources ==
- Amorós, Jaume; Burger, Marc; Corlette, Kevin; Kotschick, Dieter; Toledo, Domingo (1996), Fundamental Groups of Compact Kähler Manifolds, Mathematical Surveys and Monographs, vol. 44, American Mathematical Society, doi:10.1090/surv/044, ISBN 978-0-8218-0498-8, MR 1379330
- Barth, Wolf P.; Hulek, Klaus; Peters, Chris A.M.; Van de Ven, Antonius (2004) [1984], Compact Complex Surfaces, Ergebnisse der Mathematik und ihrer Grenzgebiete. 3. Folge / A Series of Modern Surveys in Mathematics, vol. 4, Springer, doi:10.1007/978-3-642-57739-0, ISBN 978-3-540-00832-3, MR 2030225
- Buchdahl, Nicholas (1999). "On compact Kähler surfaces". Annales de l'Institut Fourier. 49 (1): 287–302. doi:10.5802/aif.1674. MR 1688136. Zbl 0926.32025.
- Cannas da Silva, Ana (2001), Lectures on Symplectic Geometry, Lecture Notes in Mathematics, vol. 1764, Springer, doi:10.1007/978-3-540-45330-7, ISBN 978-3540421955, MR 1853077
- Demailly, Jean-Pierre (2012), Complex Analytic and Differential Geometry (PDF)
- Griffiths, Phillip; Harris, Joseph (1994) [1978]. Principles of Algebraic Geometry. John Wiley & Sons. ISBN 978-0-471-05059-9. MR 0507725.
- Kähler, Erich (1933), "Über eine bemerkenswerte Hermitesche Metrik", Abh. Math. Sem. Univ. Hamburg, 9 (1): 173–186, doi:10.1007/BF02940642, JFM 58.0780.02, S2CID 122246578
- Huybrechts, Daniel (2005), Complex Geometry: An Introduction, Springer, ISBN 978-3-540-21290-4, MR 2093043
- Kobayashi, Shoshichi; Nomizu, Katsumi (1996) [1969], Foundations of Differential Geometry, vol. 2, John Wiley & Sons, ISBN 978-0-471-15732-8, MR 1393941
- Kodaira, K. (1954). "On Kahler Varieties of Restricted Type an Intrinsic Characterization of Algebraic Varieties)". Annals of Mathematics. 60 (1): 28–48. doi:10.2307/1969701. JSTOR 1969701.
- Lamari, Ahcène (1999). "Courants kählériens et surfaces compactes". Annales de l'Institut Fourier. 49 (1): 263–285. doi:10.5802/aif.1673. MR 1688140. Zbl 0926.32026.
- Lee, Man-Chun; Streets, Jeffrey (2021). "Complex Manifolds with Negative Curvature Operator". International Mathematics Research Notices. 2021 (24): 18520–18528. arXiv:1903.12645. doi:10.1093/imrn/rnz331. S2CID 88524040.
- Moroianu, Andrei (2007), Lectures on Kähler Geometry, London Mathematical Society Student Texts, vol. 69, Cambridge University Press, arXiv:math/0402223, doi:10.1017/CBO9780511618666, ISBN 978-0-521-68897-0, MR 2325093
- Voisin, Claire (2004), "On the homotopy types of compact Kähler and complex projective manifolds", Inventiones Mathematicae, 157 (2): 329–343, arXiv:math/0312032, Bibcode:2004InMat.157..329V, doi:10.1007/s00222-003-0352-1, MR 2076925, S2CID 11984149
- Yang, Xiaokui; Zheng, Fangyang (2018). "On real bisectional curvature for Hermitian manifolds". Transactions of the American Mathematical Society. 371 (4): 2703–2718. arXiv:1610.07165. doi:10.1090/tran/7445. S2CID 119669591.
- Wells, Raymond O. (2007). Differential Analysis on Complex Manifolds. Springer. ISBN 9780387738925.
- Zheng, Fangyang (2000), Complex Differential Geometry, American Mathematical Society, ISBN 978-0-8218-2163-3, MR 1777835
