= Calabi conjecture =

Riemannian metrics, complex manifolds

In the mathematical field of differential geometry, the Calabi conjecture was a conjecture about the existence of certain kinds of Riemannian metrics on certain complex manifolds, made by Eugenio Calabi (1954, 1957). It was proved by Shing-Tung Yau (1977, 1978), who received the Fields Medal and Oswald Veblen Prize in part for his proof. His work, principally an analysis of an elliptic partial differential equation known as the complex Monge–Ampère equation, was an influential early result in the field of geometric analysis.

More precisely, Calabi's conjecture asserts the resolution of the prescribed Ricci curvature problem within the setting of Kähler metrics on closed complex manifolds. According to Chern–Weil theory, the Ricci form of any such metric is a closed differential 2-form which represents the first Chern class. Calabi conjectured that for any such differential form R, there is exactly one Kähler metric in each Kähler class whose Ricci form is R. (Some compact complex manifolds admit no Kähler classes, in which case the conjecture is vacuous.)

In the special case that the first Chern class vanishes, this implies that each Kähler class contains exactly one Ricci-flat metric. These are often called Calabi–Yau manifolds. However, the term is often used in slightly different ways by various authors — for example, some uses may refer to the complex manifold while others might refer to a complex manifold together with a particular Ricci-flat Kähler metric.

This special case can equivalently be regarded as the complete existence and uniqueness theory for Kähler–Einstein metrics of zero scalar curvature on compact complex manifolds. The case of nonzero scalar curvature does not follow as a special case of Calabi's conjecture, since the 'right-hand side' of the Kähler–Einstein problem depends on the 'unknown' metric, thereby placing the Kähler–Einstein problem outside the domain of prescribing Ricci curvature. However, Yau's analysis of the complex Monge–Ampère equation in resolving the Calabi conjecture was sufficiently general so as to also resolve the existence of Kähler–Einstein metrics of negative scalar curvature. The third and final case of positive scalar curvature was resolved in the 2010s, in part by making use of the Calabi conjecture.

== Outline of the proof of the Calabi conjecture ==
Calabi transformed the Calabi conjecture into a non-linear partial differential equation of complex Monge–Ampère type, and showed that this equation has at most one solution, thus establishing the uniqueness of the required Kähler metric.

Yau proved the Calabi conjecture by constructing a solution of this equation using the continuity method. This involves first solving an easier equation, and then showing that a solution to the easy equation can be continuously deformed to a solution of the hard equation. The hardest part of Yau's solution is proving certain a priori estimates for the derivatives of solutions.

=== Transformation of the Calabi conjecture to a differential equation ===
Suppose that $M$ is a complex compact manifold with a Kähler form $\omega$. By the $\partial \bar \partial$-lemma, any other Kähler form in the same de Rham cohomology class is of the form

$$\omega+dd'\varphi$$

for some smooth function $\varphi$ on $M$, unique up to addition of a constant. The Calabi conjecture is therefore equivalent to the following problem:

Let $F=e^f$ be a positive smooth function on $M$ with average value 1. Then there is a smooth real function $\varphi$; with

$$(\omega+dd'\varphi)^m = e^f\omega^m$$

and $\varphi$; is unique up to addition of a constant.

This is an equation of complex Monge–Ampère type for a single function $\varphi$. It is a particularly hard partial differential equation to solve, as it is non-linear in the terms of highest order. It is easy to solve it when $f=0$, as $\varphi = 0$ is a solution. The idea of the continuity method is to show that it can be solved for all $f$ by showing that the set of $f$ for which it can be solved is both open and closed. Since the set of $f$ for which it can be solved is non-empty, and the set of all $f$ is connected, this shows that it can be solved for all $f$.

The map from smooth functions to smooth functions taking $\varphi$ to $F$ defined by

$$F=(\omega+dd'\varphi)^m/\omega^m$$

is neither injective nor surjective. It is not injective because adding a constant to $\varphi$ does not change $F$, and it is not surjective because $F$ must be positive and have average value 1. So we consider the map restricted to functions $\varphi$ that are normalized to have average value 0, and ask if this map is an isomorphism onto the set of positive $F=e^f$ with average value 1. Calabi and Yau proved that it is indeed an isomorphism. This is done in several steps, described below.

=== Uniqueness of the solution ===
Proving that the solution is unique involves showing that if

$$(\omega+dd'\varphi_1)^m = (\omega+dd'\varphi_2)^m$$

then φ_{1} and φ_{2} differ by a constant (so must be the same if they are both normalized to have average value 0). Calabi proved this by showing that the average value of

$$|d(\varphi_1-\varphi_2)|^2$$

is given by an expression that is at most 0. As it is clearly at least 0, it must be 0, so

$$d(\varphi_1-\varphi_2) = 0$$

which in turn forces φ_{1} and φ_{2} to differ by a constant.

=== The set of F is open ===
Proving that the set of possible F is open (in the set of smooth functions with average value 1) involves showing that if it is possible to solve the equation for some F, then it is possible to solve it for all sufficiently close F. Calabi proved this by using the implicit function theorem for Banach spaces: in order to apply this, the main step is to show that the linearization of the differential operator above is invertible.

=== The set of F is closed ===
This is the hardest part of the proof, and was the part done by Yau. Suppose that F is in the closure of the image of possible functions φ. This means that there is a sequence of functions φ_{1}, φ_{2}, ... such that the corresponding functions F_{1}, F_{2},... converge to F, and the problem is to show that some subsequence of the φs converges to a solution φ. In order to do this, Yau finds some a priori bounds for the functions φ_{i} and their higher derivatives in terms of the higher derivatives of log(f_{i}). Finding these bounds requires a long sequence of hard estimates, each improving slightly on the previous estimate. The bounds Yau gets are enough to show that the functions φ_{i} all lie in a compact subset of a suitable Banach space of functions, so it is possible to find a convergent subsequence. This subsequence converges to a function φ with image F, which shows that the set of possible images F is closed.
