= Complex geometry =

Study of complex manifolds and several complex variables

In mathematics, complex geometry is the study of geometric structures and constructions arising out of, or described by, the complex numbers. In particular, complex geometry is concerned with the study of spaces such as complex manifolds and complex algebraic varieties, functions of several complex variables, and holomorphic constructions such as holomorphic vector bundles and coherent sheaves. Application of transcendental methods to algebraic geometry falls in this category, together with more geometric aspects of complex analysis.

Complex geometry sits at the intersection of algebraic geometry, differential geometry, and complex analysis, and uses tools from all three areas. Because of the blend of techniques and ideas from various areas, problems in complex geometry are often more tractable or concrete than in general. For example, the classification of complex manifolds and complex algebraic varieties through the minimal model program and the construction of moduli spaces sets the field apart from differential geometry, where the classification of possible smooth manifolds is a significantly harder problem. Additionally, the extra structure of complex geometry allows, especially in the compact setting, for global analytic results to be proven with great success, including Shing-Tung Yau's proof of the Calabi conjecture, the Hitchin–Kobayashi correspondence, the nonabelian Hodge correspondence, and existence results for Kähler–Einstein metrics and constant scalar curvature Kähler metrics. These results often feed back into complex algebraic geometry, and for example recently the classification of Fano manifolds using K-stability has benefited tremendously both from techniques in analysis and in pure birational geometry.

Complex geometry has significant applications to theoretical physics, where it is essential in understanding conformal field theory, string theory, and mirror symmetry. It is often a source of examples in other areas of mathematics, including in representation theory where generalized flag varieties may be studied using complex geometry leading to the Borel–Weil–Bott theorem, or in symplectic geometry, where Kähler manifolds are symplectic, in Riemannian geometry where complex manifolds provide examples of exotic metric structures such as Calabi–Yau manifolds and hyperkähler manifolds, and in gauge theory, where holomorphic vector bundles often admit solutions to important differential equations arising out of physics such as the Yang–Mills equations. Complex geometry additionally is impactful in pure algebraic geometry, where analytic results in the complex setting such as Hodge theory of Kähler manifolds inspire understanding of Hodge structures for varieties and schemes as well as p-adic Hodge theory, deformation theory for complex manifolds inspires understanding of the deformation theory of schemes, and results about the cohomology of complex manifolds inspired the formulation of the Weil conjectures and Grothendieck's standard conjectures. On the other hand, results and techniques from many of these fields often feed back into complex geometry, and for example developments in the mathematics of string theory and mirror symmetry have revealed much about the nature of Calabi–Yau manifolds, which string theorists predict should have the structure of Lagrangian fibrations through the SYZ conjecture, and the development of Gromov–Witten theory of symplectic manifolds has led to advances in enumerative geometry of complex varieties.

The Hodge conjecture, one of the millennium prize problems, is a problem in complex geometry.

== Idea ==
A typical example of a complex space is the complex projective line. It may be viewed either as the sphere, a smooth manifold arising from differential geometry, or the Riemann sphere, an extension of the complex plane by adding a point at infinity.

Broadly, complex geometry is concerned with spaces and geometric objects which are modelled, in some sense, on the complex plane. Features of the complex plane and complex analysis of a single variable, such as an intrinsic notion of orientability (that is, being able to consistently rotate 90 degrees counterclockwise at every point in the complex plane), and the rigidity of holomorphic functions (that is, the existence of a single complex derivative implies complex differentiability to all orders) are seen to manifest in all forms of the study of complex geometry. As an example, every complex manifold is canonically orientable, and a form of Liouville's theorem holds on compact complex manifolds or projective complex algebraic varieties.

Complex geometry is different in flavour to what might be called real geometry, the study of spaces based around the geometric and analytical properties of the real number line. For example, whereas smooth manifolds admit partitions of unity, collections of smooth functions which can be identically equal to one on some open set, and identically zero elsewhere, complex manifolds admit no such collections of holomorphic functions. Indeed, this is the manifestation of the identity theorem, a typical result in complex analysis of a single variable. In some sense, the novelty of complex geometry may be traced back to this fundamental observation.

It is true that every complex manifold is in particular a real smooth manifold. This is because the complex plane $\mathbb{C}$ is, after forgetting its complex structure, isomorphic to the real plane $\mathbb{R}^2$. However, complex geometry is not typically seen as a particular sub-field of differential geometry, the study of smooth manifolds. In particular, Serre's GAGA theorem says that every projective analytic variety is actually an algebraic variety, and the study of holomorphic data on an analytic variety is equivalent to the study of algebraic data.

This equivalence indicates that complex geometry is in some sense closer to algebraic geometry than to differential geometry. Another example of this which links back to the nature of the complex plane is that, in complex analysis of a single variable, singularities of meromorphic functions are readily describable. In contrast, the possible singular behaviour of a continuous real-valued function is much more difficult to characterise. As a result of this, one can readily study singular spaces in complex geometry, such as singular complex analytic varieties or singular complex algebraic varieties, whereas in differential geometry the study of singular spaces is often avoided.

In practice, complex geometry sits in the intersection of differential geometry, algebraic geometry, and analysis in several complex variables, and a complex geometer uses tools from all three fields to study complex spaces. Typical directions of interest in complex geometry involve classification of complex spaces, the study of holomorphic objects attached to them (such as holomorphic vector bundles and coherent sheaves), and the intimate relationships between complex geometric objects and other areas of mathematics and physics.

== Definitions ==
Complex geometry is concerned with the study of complex manifolds, and complex algebraic and complex analytic varieties. In this section, these types of spaces are defined and the relationships between them presented.

A complex manifold of dimension $n$ is a topological space $X$, endowed with an open cover $(U_\alpha)_{\alpha\in A}$, and a family of homeomorphisms $(\phi_\alpha\colon U_\alpha\to V_\alpha)_{\alpha\in A}$ from $U_\alpha$ to an open subset $V_\alpha$ of $\mathbb{C}^n$such that:

- $X$ is Hausdorff and second countable.
- If $(U_1,\varphi)$ and $(U_2,\psi)$ are any two overlapping charts which map onto open sets $V_1, V_2$ of $\mathbb{C}^n$ respectively, then the transition function $\psi \circ \varphi^{-1}:\varphi(U_1\cap U_2) \to \psi(U_1\cap U_2)$ is a biholomorphism.

Notice that since every biholomorphism is a diffeomorphism, and $\mathbb{C}^n$ is isomorphism as a real vector space to $\mathbb{R}^{2n}$, every complex manifold of dimension $n$ is in particular a smooth manifold of dimension $2n$, which is always an even number.

In contrast to complex manifolds which are always smooth, complex geometry is also concerned with possibly singular spaces. An affine complex analytic variety is a subset $X\subseteq \mathbb{C}^n$ such that about each point $p\in X$, there is an open neighbourhood $U$ of $p$ and a collection of finitely many holomorphic functions $f_1, \dots, f_k: U \to \mathbb{C}$ such that $X\cap U = \{z\in U \mid f_1(z) = \cdots = f_k(z) = 0\} = Z(f_1,\dots,f_k)$. By convention we also require the set $X$ to be irreducible. A point $p\in X$ is singular if the Jacobian matrix of the vector of holomorphic functions $(f_1,\dots,f_k)$ does not have full rank at $p$, and non-singular otherwise. A projective complex analytic variety is a subset $X\subseteq \mathbb{CP}^n$ of complex projective space that is, in the same way, locally given by the zeroes of a finite collection of holomorphic functions on open subsets of $\mathbb{CP}^n$.

One may similarly define an affine complex algebraic variety to be a subset $X\subseteq \mathbb{C}^n$ which is locally given as the zero set of finitely many polynomials in $n$ complex variables. To define a projective complex algebraic variety, one requires the subset $X\subseteq \mathbb{CP}^n$ to locally be given by the zero set of finitely many homogeneous polynomials.

In order to define a general complex algebraic or complex analytic variety, one requires the notion of a locally ringed space. A complex algebraic/analytic variety is a locally ringed space $(X,\mathcal{O}_X)$ which is locally isomorphic as a locally ringed space to an affine complex algebraic/analytic variety. In the analytic case, one typically allows $X$ to have a topology that is locally equivalent to the subspace topology due to the identification with open subsets of $\mathbb{C}^n$, whereas in the algebraic case $X$ is often equipped with a Zariski topology. Again we also by convention require this locally ringed space to be irreducible.

Since the definition of a singular point is local, the definition given for an affine analytic/algebraic variety applies to the points of any complex analytic or algebraic variety. The set of points of a variety $X$ which are singular is called the singular locus, denoted $X^{sing}$, and the complement is the non-singular or smooth locus, denoted $X^{nonsing}$. We say a complex variety is smooth or non-singular if it's singular locus is empty. That is, if it is equal to its non-singular locus.

By the implicit function theorem for holomorphic functions, every complex manifold is in particular a non-singular complex analytic variety, but is not in general affine or projective. By Serre's GAGA theorem, every projective complex analytic variety is actually a projective complex algebraic variety. When a complex variety is non-singular, it is a complex manifold. More generally, the non-singular locus of any complex variety is a complex manifold.

== Types of complex spaces ==
=== Kähler manifolds ===
Complex manifolds may be studied from the perspective of differential geometry, whereby they are equipped with extra geometric structures such as a Riemannian metric or symplectic form. In order for this extra structure to be relevant to complex geometry, one should ask for it to be compatible with the complex structure in a suitable sense. A Kähler manifold is a complex manifold with a Riemannian metric and symplectic structure compatible with the complex structure. Every complex submanifold of a Kähler manifold is Kähler, and so in particular every non-singular affine or projective complex variety is Kähler, after restricting the standard Hermitian metric on $\mathbb{C}^n$ or the Fubini-Study metric on $\mathbb{CP}^n$ respectively.

Other important examples of Kähler manifolds include Riemann surfaces, K3 surfaces, and Calabi–Yau manifolds.

=== Stein manifolds ===
Serre's GAGA theorem asserts that projective complex analytic varieties are actually algebraic. Whilst this is not strictly true for affine varieties, there is a class of complex manifolds that act very much like affine complex algebraic varieties, called Stein manifolds. A manifold $X$ is Stein if it is holomorphically convex and holomorphically separable (see the article on Stein manifolds for the technical definitions). It can be shown however that this is equivalent to $X$ admitting a proper holomorphic embedding into $\mathbb{C}^n$ for some $n$. Another way in which Stein manifolds are similar to affine complex algebraic varieties is that Cartan's theorems A and B hold for Stein manifolds.

Examples of Stein manifolds include non-compact Riemann surfaces and non-singular affine complex algebraic varieties.

=== Hyper-Kähler manifolds ===
A special class of complex manifolds is hyper-Kähler manifolds, which are Riemannian manifolds admitting three distinct compatible integrable almost complex structures $I,J,K$ which satisfy the quaternionic relations $I^2 = J^2 = K^2 = IJK = -\operatorname{Id}$. Thus, hyper-Kähler manifolds are Kähler manifolds in three different ways, and subsequently have a rich geometric structure.

Examples of hyper-Kähler manifolds include ALE spaces, K3 surfaces, Higgs bundle moduli spaces, quiver varieties, and many other moduli spaces arising out of gauge theory and representation theory.

=== Calabi–Yau manifolds ===
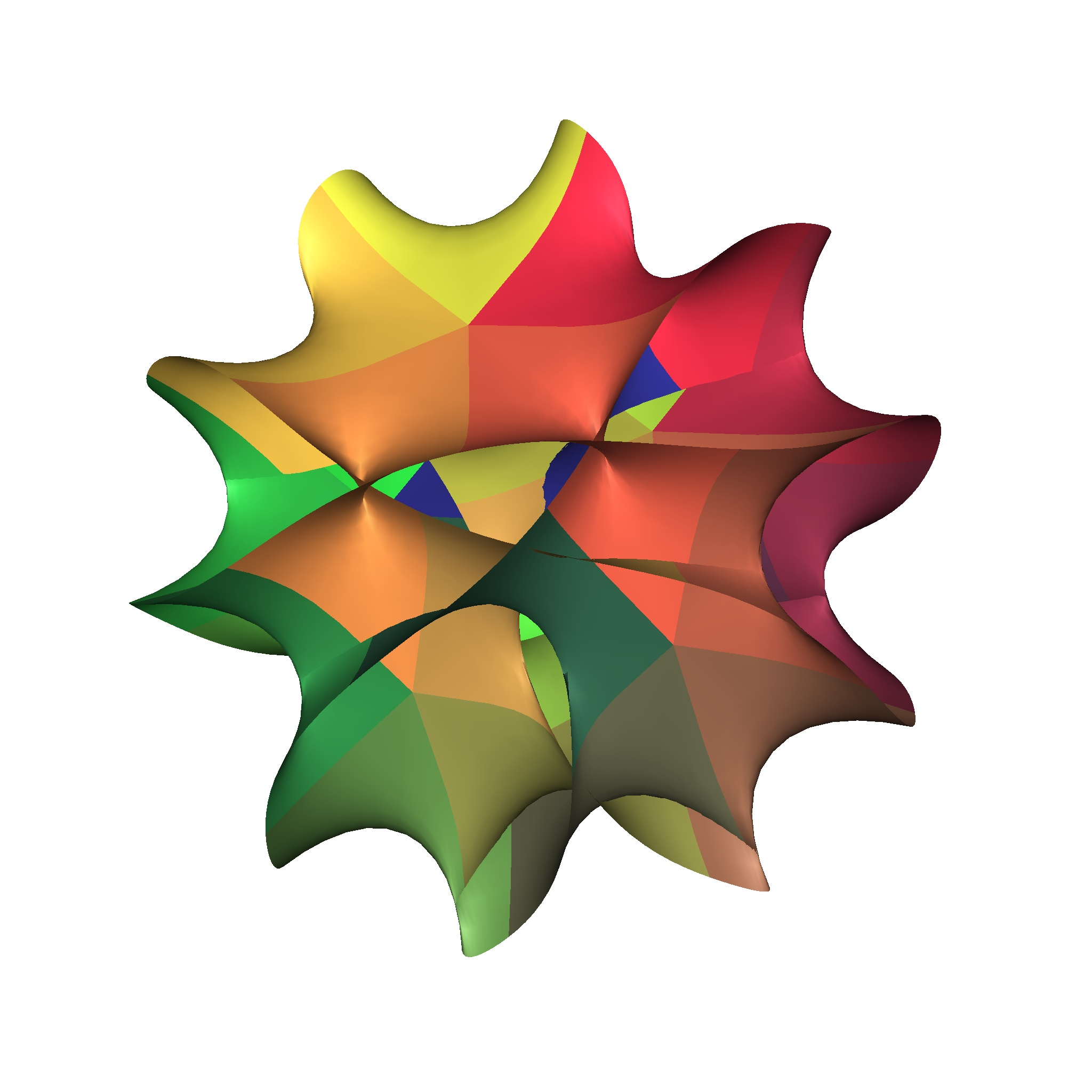
A real two-dimensional slice of a quintic Calabi–Yau threefold

As mentioned, a particular class of Kähler manifolds is given by Calabi–Yau manifolds. These are given by Kähler manifolds with trivial canonical bundle $K_X = \Lambda^n T_{1,0}^* X$. Typically the definition of a Calabi–Yau manifold also requires $X$ to be compact. In this case Yau's proof of the Calabi conjecture implies that $X$ admits a Kähler metric with vanishing Ricci curvature, and this may be taken as an equivalent definition of Calabi–Yau.

Calabi–Yau manifolds have found use in string theory and mirror symmetry, where they are used to model the extra 6 dimensions of spacetime in 10-dimensional models of string theory. Examples of Calabi–Yau manifolds are given by elliptic curves, K3 surfaces, and complex Abelian varieties.

=== Complex Fano varieties ===
A complex Fano variety is a complex algebraic variety with ample anti-canonical line bundle (that is, $K_X^*$ is ample). Fano varieties are of considerable interest in complex algebraic geometry, and in particular birational geometry, where they often arise in the minimal model program. Fundamental examples of Fano varieties are given by projective space $\mathbb{CP}^n$ where $K=\mathcal{O}(-n-1)$, and smooth hypersurfaces of $\mathbb{CP}^n$ of degree less than $n+1$.

=== Toric varieties ===
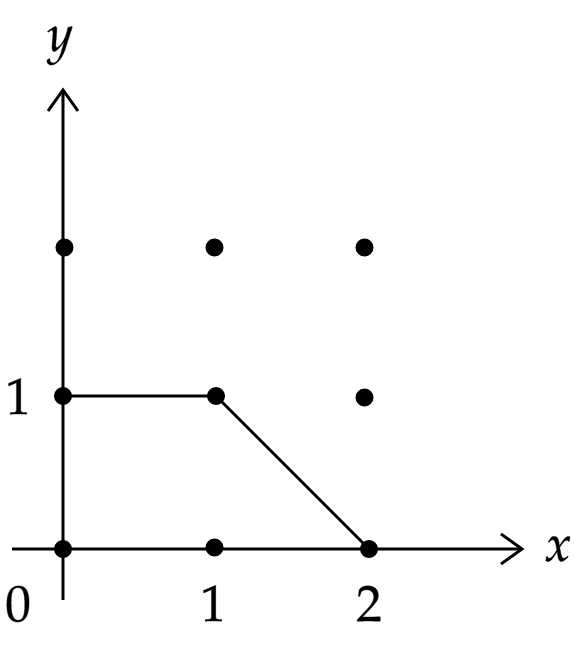
Moment polytope describing the first Hirzebruch surface.

Toric varieties are complex algebraic varieties of dimension $n$ containing an open dense subset biholomorphic to $(\mathbb{C}^*)^n$, equipped with an action of $(\mathbb{C}^*)^n$ which extends the action on the open dense subset. A toric variety may be described combinatorially by its toric fan, and at least when it is non-singular, by a moment polytope. This is a polygon in $\mathbb{R}^n$ with the property that any vertex may be put into the standard form of the vertex of the positive orthant by the action of $\operatorname{GL}(n,\mathbb{Z})$. The toric variety can be obtained as a suitable space which fibres over the polytope.

Many constructions that are performed on toric varieties admit alternate descriptions in terms of the combinatorics and geometry of the moment polytope or its associated toric fan. This makes toric varieties a particularly attractive test case for many constructions in complex geometry. Examples of toric varieties include complex projective spaces, and bundles over them.

== Techniques in complex geometry ==
Due to the rigidity of holomorphic functions and complex manifolds, the techniques typically used to study complex manifolds and complex varieties differ from those used in regular differential geometry, and are closer to techniques used in algebraic geometry. For example, in differential geometry, many problems are approached by taking local constructions and patching them together globally using partitions of unity. Partitions of unity do not exist in complex geometry, and so the problem of when local data may be glued into global data is more subtle. Precisely when local data may be patched together is measured by sheaf cohomology, and sheaves and their cohomology groups are major tools.

For example, famous problems in the analysis of several complex variables preceding the introduction of modern definitions are the Cousin problems, asking precisely when local meromorphic data may be glued to obtain a global meromorphic function. These old problems can be simply solved after the introduction of sheaves and cohomology groups.

Special examples of sheaves used in complex geometry include holomorphic line bundles (and the divisors associated to them), holomorphic vector bundles, and coherent sheaves. Since sheaf cohomology measures obstructions in complex geometry, one technique that is used is to prove vanishing theorems. Examples of vanishing theorems in complex geometry include the Kodaira vanishing theorem for the cohomology of line bundles on compact Kähler manifolds, and Cartan's theorems A and B for the cohomology of coherent sheaves on affine complex varieties.

Complex geometry also makes use of techniques arising out of differential geometry and analysis. For example, the Hirzebruch-Riemann-Roch theorem, a special case of the Atiyah-Singer index theorem, computes the holomorphic Euler characteristic of a holomorphic vector bundle in terms of characteristic classes of the underlying smooth complex vector bundle.

== Classification in complex geometry ==
One major theme in complex geometry is classification. Due to the rigid nature of complex manifolds and varieties, the problem of classifying these spaces is often tractable. Classification in complex and algebraic geometry often occurs through the study of moduli spaces, which themselves are complex manifolds or varieties whose points classify other geometric objects arising in complex geometry.

=== Riemann surfaces ===
The term moduli was coined by Bernhard Riemann during his original work on Riemann surfaces. The classification theory is most well known for compact Riemann surfaces. By the classification of closed oriented surfaces, compact Riemann surfaces come in a countable number of discrete types, measured by their genus $g$, which is a non-negative integer counting the number of holes in the given compact Riemann surface.

The classification essentially follows from the uniformization theorem, and is as follows:

- g = 0: $\mathbb{CP}^1$
- g = 1: There is a one-dimensional complex manifold classifying possible compact Riemann surfaces of genus 1, so-called elliptic curves, the modular curve. By the uniformization theorem any elliptic curve may be written as a quotient $\mathbb{C}/(\mathbb{Z} + \tau \mathbb{Z})$ where $\tau$ is a complex number with strictly positive imaginary part. The moduli space is given by the quotient of the group $\operatorname{PSL}(2,\mathbb{Z})$ acting on the upper half plane by Möbius transformations.
- g > 1: For each genus greater than one, there is a moduli space $\mathcal{M}_g$ of genus g compact Riemann surfaces, of dimension $\dim_{\mathbb{C}} \mathcal{M}_g = 3g-3$. Similar to the case of elliptic curves, this space may be obtained by a suitable quotient of Siegel upper half-space by the action of the group $\operatorname{Sp}(2g, \mathbb{Z})$.

=== Complex surfaces ===
The tripartition of Riemann surfaces according to the genus has a higher-rank analog : Any $n$-dimensional compact manifold $X$ has a Kodaira dimension which can take $n+1$ values

$$\kappa(X)\in\{-\infty, 0,1,\dots,n\}.$$

Compact manifolds of maximal Kodaira dimension ($\kappa(X)=\dim(X)$) are called manifolds of general type.

In complex dimension 2, this basic classification can be refined: surfaces that are not of general type are subdivided into 9 classes, which leads to the Enriques-Kodaira classification of compact surfaces into ten classes.

=== Holomorphic line bundles ===
Complex geometry is concerned not only with complex spaces, but other holomorphic objects attached to them. The classification of holomorphic line bundles on a complex variety $X$ is given by the Picard variety $\operatorname{Pic}(X)$ of $X$.

The picard variety can be easily described in the case where $X$ is a compact Riemann surface of genus g. Namely, in this case the Picard variety is a disjoint union of complex Abelian varieties, each of which is isomorphic to the Jacobian variety of the curve, classifying divisors of degree zero up to linear equivalence. In differential-geometric terms, these Abelian varieties are complex tori, complex manifolds diffeomorphic to $(S^1)^{2g}$, possibly with one of many different complex structures.

By the Torelli theorem, a compact Riemann surface is determined by its Jacobian variety, and this demonstrates one reason why the study of structures on complex spaces can be useful, in that it can allow one to solve classify the spaces themselves.

== See also ==
- Bivector (complex)
- Calabi–Yau manifold
- Cartan's theorems A and B
- Complex analytic space
- Complex Lie group
- Complex polytope
- Complex projective space
- Cousin problems
- Deformation Theory#Deformations of complex manifolds
- Enriques–Kodaira classification
- GAGA
- Hartogs' extension theorem
- Hermitian symmetric space
- Hodge decomposition
- Hopf manifold
- Imaginary line (mathematics)
- Kobayashi metric
- Kobayashi–Hitchin correspondence
- Kähler manifold
- $\partial \bar \partial$-lemma
- Lelong number
- List of complex and algebraic surfaces
- Mirror symmetry
- Multiplier ideal
- Projective variety
- Pseudoconvexity
- Several complex variables
- Stein manifold

== Sources ==
- Huybrechts, Daniel (2005). Complex Geometry: An Introduction. Springer. ISBN 3-540-21290-6.
- Griffiths, Phillip; Harris, Joseph (1994), Principles of algebraic geometry, Wiley Classics Library, New York: John Wiley & Sons, ISBN 978-0-471-05059-9, MR 1288523
- Hörmander, Lars (1990) [1966], An Introduction to Complex Analysis in Several Variables, North–Holland Mathematical Library, vol. 7 (3rd (Revised) ed.), Amsterdam–London–New York–Tokyo: North-Holland, ISBN 0-444-88446-7, MR 1045639, Zbl 0685.32001
- S. Kobayashi, K. Nomizu. Foundations of Differential Geometry (Wiley Classics Library) Volume 1, 2.
- Miranda, Rick (1997). Algebraic curves and Riemann surfaces. Graduate studies in mathematics (Reprinted with corrections ed.). Providence, RI: American Mathematical Society. ISBN 978-0-8218-0268-7.
- Voisin, Claire (2007). Hodge theory and complex algebraic geometry. 1. Cambridge studies in advanced mathematics (1. paperback ed.). Cambridge: Cambridge Univ. Press. ISBN 978-0-521-71801-1.
- Zheng, Fangyang (2001). Complex differential geometry. AMS/IP studies in advanced mathematics (Reprint. with corr ed.). Providence, RI: American Mathematical Society. ISBN 978-0-8218-2960-8.
