= Thomas–Yau conjecture =

Conjecture in symplectic geometry

In mathematics, and especially symplectic geometry, the Thomas–Yau conjecture asks for the existence of a stability condition, similar to those which appear in algebraic geometry, which guarantees the existence of a solution to the special Lagrangian equation inside a Hamiltonian isotopy class of Lagrangian submanifolds. In particular the conjecture contains two difficulties: first it asks what a suitable stability condition might be, and secondly if one can prove stability of an isotopy class if and only if it contains a special Lagrangian representative.

The Thomas–Yau conjecture was proposed by Richard Thomas and Shing-Tung Yau in 2001, and was motivated by similar theorems in algebraic geometry relating existence of solutions to geometric partial differential equations and stability conditions, especially the Kobayashi–Hitchin correspondence relating slope stable vector bundles to Hermitian Yang–Mills metrics.

The conjecture is intimately related to mirror symmetry, a conjecture in string theory and mathematical physics which predicts that mirror to a symplectic manifold (which is a Calabi–Yau manifold) there should be another Calabi–Yau manifold for which the symplectic structure is interchanged with the complex structure. In particular mirror symmetry predicts that special Lagrangians, which are the Type IIA string theory model of BPS D-branes, should be interchanged with the same structures in the Type IIB model, which are given either by stable vector bundles or vector bundles admitting Hermitian Yang–Mills or possibly deformed Hermitian Yang–Mills metrics. Motivated by this, Dominic Joyce rephrased the Thomas–Yau conjecture in 2014, predicting that the stability condition may be understood using the theory of Bridgeland stability conditions defined on the Fukaya category of the Calabi–Yau manifold, which is a triangulated category appearing in Kontsevich's homological mirror symmetry conjecture.

== Statement ==
The statement of the Thomas–Yau conjecture is not completely precise, as the particular stability condition is not yet known. In the work of Thomas and Thomas–Yau, the stability condition was given in terms of the Lagrangian mean curvature flow inside the Hamiltonian isotopy class of the Lagrangian, but Joyce's reinterpretation of the conjecture predicts that this stability condition can be given a categorical or algebraic form in terms of Bridgeland stability conditions.

=== Special Lagrangian submanifolds ===
Consider a Calabi–Yau manifold $(X,\omega,\Omega)$ of complex dimension $n$, which is in particular a real symplectic manifold of dimension $2n$. Then a Lagrangian submanifold is a real $n$-dimensional submanifold $L\subset X$ such that the symplectic form is identically zero when restricted to $L$, that is $\left.\omega\right|_L = 0$. The holomorphic volume form $\Omega\in \Omega^{n,0}(X)$, when restricted to a Lagrangian submanifold, becomes a top degree differential form. If the Lagrangian is oriented, then there exists a volume form $dV_L$ on $L$ and one may compare this volume form to the restriction of the holomorphic volume form: $\left.\Omega\right|_L = f dV_L$ for some complex-valued function $f:L\to \mathbb{C}$. The condition that $X$ is a Calabi–Yau manifold implies that the function $f$ has norm 1, so we have $f=e^{i\Theta}$ where $\Theta:L \to [0,2\pi)$ is the phase angle of the function $f$. In principle this phase function is only locally continuous, and its value may jump. A graded Lagrangian is a Lagrangian together with a lifting $\vartheta: L \to \mathbb{R}$ of the phase angle to $\mathbb{R}$, which satisfies $\Theta = \vartheta \mod 2\pi$ everywhere on $L$.

An oriented, graded Lagrangian $L$ is said to be a special Lagrangian submanifold if the phase angle function $\vartheta$ is constant on $L$. The average value of this function, denoted $\theta$, may be computed using the volume form as

$\theta = \arg \int_L \Omega,$

and only depends on the Hamiltonian isotopy class of $L$. Using this average value, the condition that $\Theta$ is constant may be written in the following form, which commonly occurs in the literature. This is the definition of a special Lagrangian submanifold:

$\mathrm{Im}(e^{-i\theta} \left.\Omega\right|_L) = 0.$

=== Hamiltonian isotopy classes ===
The condition of being a special Lagrangian is not satisfied for all Lagrangians, but the geometric and especially physical properties of Lagrangian submanifolds in string theory are predicted to only depend on the Hamiltonian isotopy class of the Lagrangian submanifold. An isotopy is a transformation of a submanifold inside an ambient manifold which is a homotopy by embeddings. On a symplectic manifold, a symplectic isotopy requires that these embeddings are by symplectomorphisms, and a Hamiltonian isotopy is a symplectic isotopy for which the symplectomorphisms are generated by Hamiltonian functions. Given a Lagrangian submanifold $L$, the condition of being a Lagrangian is preserved under Hamiltonian (in fact symplectic) isotopies, and the collection of all Lagrangian submanifolds which are Hamiltonian isotopic to $L$ is denoted $[L]$, called the Hamiltonian isotopy class of $L$.

=== Lagrangian mean curvature flow and stability condition ===
Given a Riemannian manifold $M$ and a submanifold $\iota: N \hookrightarrow M$, the mean curvature flow is a differential equation satisfied for a one-parameter family $\iota_t$ of embeddings defined for in $t$ some interval $[0,T)$ with images denoted $N^t$, where $N^0 = N$. Namely, the family satisfies mean curvature flow if

$\frac{d\iota_t}{dt} = H_{\iota_t}$

where $H_{\iota_t}$ is the mean curvature of the submanifold $N^t\subset M$. This flow is the gradient flow of the volume functional on submanifolds of the Riemannian manifold $M$, and there always exists short time existence of solutions starting from a given submanifold $N$.

On a Calabi–Yau manifold, if $L$ is a Lagrangian, the condition of being a Lagrangian is preserved when studying the mean curvature flow of $L$ with respect to the Calabi–Yau metric. This is therefore called the Lagrangian mean curvature flow (Lmcf). Furthermore, for a graded Lagrangian $(L,\vartheta)$, Lmcf preserves Hamiltonian isotopy class, so $L^t \in [L]$ for all $t\in [0,T)$ where the Lmcf is defined.

Thomas introduced a conjectural stability condition defined in terms of gradings when splitting into Lagrangian connected sums. Namely a graded Lagrangian $(L,\vartheta)$ is called stable if whenever it may be written as a graded Lagrangian connected sum

$(L,\vartheta) = (L_1,\vartheta_1)\#(L_2,\vartheta_2)$

the average phases satisfy the inequality

$\theta_1 < \theta_2.$

In the later language of Joyce using the notion of a Bridgeland stability condition, this was further explained as follows. An almost-calibrated Lagrangian (which means the lifted phase is taken to lie in the interval $(-\pi/2, \pi/2)$ or some integer shift of this interval) which splits as a graded connected sum of almost-calibrated Lagrangians corresponds to a distinguished triangle

$L_1 \to L_1 \# L_2 \to L_2 \to L_1[1]$

in the Fukaya category. The Lagrangian $(L,\vartheta)$ is stable if for any such distinguished triangle, the above angle inequality holds.

=== Statement of the conjecture ===
The conjecture as originally proposed by Thomas is as follows:

Conjecture: An oriented, graded, almost-calibrated Lagrangian $L$ admits a special Lagrangian representative in its Hamiltonian isotopy class $[L]$ if and only if it is stable in the above sense.

Following this, in the work of Thomas–Yau, the behaviour of the Lagrangian mean curvature flow was also predicted.

Conjecture (Thomas–Yau): If an oriented, graded, almost-calibrated Lagrangian $L$ is stable, then the Lagrangian mean curvature flow exists for all time and converges to a special Lagrangian representative in the Hamiltonian isotopy class $[L]$.

This conjecture was enhanced by Joyce, who provided a more subtle analysis of what behaviour is expected of the Lagrangian mean curvature flow. In particular Joyce described the types of finite-time singularity formation which are expected to occur in the Lagrangian mean curvature flow, and proposed expanding the class of Lagrangians studied to include singular or immersed Lagrangian submanifolds, which should appear in the full Fukaya category of the Calabi–Yau.

Conjecture (Thomas–Yau–Joyce): An oriented, graded, almost-calibrated Lagrangian $L$ splits as a graded Lagrangian connected sum $L=L_1 \# \cdots \# L_k$ of special Lagrangian submanifolds $L_i$ with phase angles $\theta_1 > \cdots > \theta_k$ given by the convergence of the Lagrangian mean curvature flow with surgeries to remove singularities at a sequence of finite times $0<T_1<\cdots < T_k$. At these surgery points, the Lagrangian may change its Hamiltonian isotopy class but preserves its class in the Fukaya category.

In the language of Joyce's formulation of the conjecture, the decomposition $L=L_1\#\cdots \#L_k$ is a symplectic analogue of the Harder-Narasimhan filtration of a vector bundle, and using Joyce's interpretation of the conjecture in the Fukaya category with respect to a Bridgeland stability condition, the central charge is given by

$Z(L) = \int_L \Omega$,

the heart $\mathcal{A}$ of the t-structure defining the stability condition is conjectured to be given by those Lagrangians in the Fukaya category with phase $\theta \in (-\pi/2, \pi/2)$, and the Thomas–Yau–Joyce conjecture predicts that the Lagrangian mean curvature flow produces the Harder–Narasimhan filtration condition which is required to prove that the data $(Z,\mathcal{A})$ defines a genuine Bridgeland stability condition on the Fukaya category.
