= Nonabelian Hodge correspondence =

Correspondsnce between Higgs bundles and fundamental group representations

In algebraic geometry and differential geometry, the nonabelian Hodge correspondence or Corlette–Simpson correspondence (named after Kevin Corlette and Carlos Simpson) is a correspondence between Higgs bundles and representations of the fundamental group of a smooth, projective complex algebraic variety, or a compact Kähler manifold.

The theorem can be considered a vast generalisation of the Narasimhan–Seshadri theorem which defines a correspondence between stable vector bundles and unitary representations of the fundamental group of a compact Riemann surface. In fact the Narasimhan–Seshadri theorem may be obtained as a special case of the nonabelian Hodge correspondence by setting the Higgs field to zero.

== History ==
It was proven by M. S. Narasimhan and C. S. Seshadri in 1965 that stable vector bundles on a compact Riemann surface correspond to irreducible projective unitary representations of the fundamental group. This theorem was phrased in a new light in the work of Simon Donaldson in 1983, who showed that stable vector bundles correspond to Yang–Mills connections, whose holonomy gives the representations of the fundamental group of Narasimhan and Seshadri. The Narasimhan–Seshadri theorem was generalised from the case of compact Riemann surfaces to the setting of compact Kähler manifolds by Donaldson in the case of algebraic surfaces, and in general by Karen Uhlenbeck and Shing-Tung Yau. This correspondence between stable vector bundles and Hermitian Yang–Mills connections is known as the Kobayashi–Hitchin correspondence.

The Narasimhan–Seshadri theorem concerns unitary representations of the fundamental group. Nigel Hitchin introduced a notion of a Higgs bundle as an algebraic object which should correspond to complex representations of the fundamental group (in fact the terminology "Higgs bundle" was introduced by Carlos Simpson after the work of Hitchin). The first instance of the nonabelian Hodge theorem was proven by Hitchin, who considered the case of rank two Higgs bundles over a compact Riemann surface. Hitchin showed that a polystable Higgs bundle corresponds to a solution of Hitchin's equations, a system of differential equations obtained as a dimensional reduction of the Yang–Mills equations to dimension two. It was shown by Donaldson in this case that solutions to Hitchin's equations are in correspondence with representations of the fundamental group.

The results of Hitchin and Donaldson for Higgs bundles of rank two on a compact Riemann surface were vastly generalised by Carlos Simpson and Kevin Corlette. The statement that polystable Higgs bundles correspond to solutions of Hitchin's equations was proven by Simpson. The correspondence between solutions of Hitchin's equations and representations of the fundamental group was shown by Corlette.

== Definitions ==
In this section we recall the objects of interest in the nonabelian Hodge theorem.

=== Higgs bundles ===
A Higgs bundle over a compact Kähler manifold $(X,\omega)$ is a pair $(E,\Phi)$ where $E\to X$ is a holomorphic vector bundle and $\Phi: E\to E\otimes \boldsymbol{\Omega}^1$ is an $\operatorname{End}(E)$-valued holomorphic $(1,0)$-form on $X$, called the Higgs field. Additionally, the Higgs field must satisfy $\Phi\wedge\Phi = 0$.

A Higgs bundle is (semi-)stable if, for every proper, non-zero coherent subsheaf $\mathcal{F}\subset E$ which is preserved by the Higgs field, so that $\Phi(\mathcal{F})\subset \mathcal{F}\otimes \boldsymbol{\Omega}^1$, one has

$$\frac{\deg (\mathcal{F})}{\operatorname{rank}(\mathcal{F})} < \frac{\deg(E)}{\operatorname{rank}(E)} \quad \text{(resp. }\le\text{)}.$$
This rational number is called the slope, denoted $\mu(E)$, and the above definition mirrors that of a stable vector bundle. A Higgs bundle is polystable if it is a direct sum of stable Higgs bundles of the same slope, and is therefore semi-stable.

=== Hermitian Yang–Mills connections and Hitchin's equations ===
The generalisation of Hitchin's equation to higher dimension can be phrased as an analog of the Hermitian Yang–Mills equations for a certain connection constructed out of the pair $(E,\Phi)$. A Hermitian metric $h$ on a Higgs bundle $(E,\Phi)$ gives rise to a Chern connection $\nabla_A$ and curvature $F_A$. The condition that $\Phi$ is holomorphic can be phrased as $\bar \partial_A \Phi = 0$. Hitchin's equations, on a compact Riemann surface, state that
$$\begin{cases}
&F_A + [\Phi, \Phi^*] = \lambda \operatorname{Id}_E\\
&\bar\partial_A \Phi = 0
\end{cases}$$
for a constant $\lambda = -2\pi i \mu(E)$. In higher dimensions these equations generalise as follows. Define a connection $D$ on $E$ by $D = \nabla_A + \Phi + \Phi^*$. This connection is said to be a Hermitian Yang–Mills connection (and the metric a Hermitian Yang–Mills metric) if
$$\Lambda_{\omega} F_D = \lambda \operatorname{Id}_E.$$
This reduces to Hitchin's equations for a compact Riemann surface. Note that the connection $D$ is not a Hermitian Yang–Mills connection in the usual sense, as it is not unitary, and the above condition is a non-unitary analogue of the normal HYM condition.

=== Representations of the fundamental group and harmonic metrics ===
A representation of the fundamental group $\rho\colon \pi_1(X) \to \operatorname{GL}(r,\Complex)$ gives rise to a vector bundle with flat connection as follows. The universal cover $\hat{X}$ of $X$ is a principal bundle over $X$ with structure group $\pi_1(X)$. Thus there is an associated bundle to $\hat{X}$ given by
$$E = \hat{X} \times_{\rho} \Complex^r.$$
This vector bundle comes naturally equipped with a flat connection $D$. If $h$ is a Hermitian metric on $E$, define an operator $D_h''$ as follows. Decompose $D=\partial + \bar \partial$ into operators of type $(1,0)$ and $(0,1)$, respectively. Let $A'$ be the unique operator of type $(1,0)$ such that the $(1,0)$-connection $A'+\bar \partial$ preserves the metric $h$. Define $\Phi = (\partial - A')/2$, and set $D_h'' = \bar \partial + \Phi$. Define the pseudocurvature of $h$ to be $G_h = (D_h'')^2$.

The metric $h$ is said to be harmonic if
$$\Lambda_{\omega} G_h = 0.$$
Notice that the condition $G_h=0$ is equivalent to the three conditions $\bar\partial^2 = 0, \bar\partial \Phi = 0, \Phi \wedge \Phi = 0$, so if $G_h=0$ then the pair $(E,\Phi)$ defines a Higgs bundle with holomorphic structure on $E$ given by the Dolbeault operator $\bar\partial$.

It is a result of Corlette that if $h$ is harmonic, then it automatically satisfies $G_h=0$ and so gives rise to a Higgs bundle.

=== Moduli spaces ===
To each of the three concepts: Higgs bundles, flat connections, and representations of the fundamental group, one can define a moduli space. This requires a notion of isomorphism between these objects. In the following, fix a smooth complex vector bundle $E$. Every Higgs bundle will be considered to have the underlying smooth vector bundle $E$.

- (Higgs bundles) The group of complex gauge transformations $\mathcal{G}^{\Complex}$ acts on the set $\mathcal{H}$ of Higgs bundles by the formula $g\cdot (E,\Phi) = (g\cdot E, g\Phi g^{-1})$. If $\mathcal{H}^{ss}$ and $\mathcal{H}^s$ denote the subsets of semistable and stable Higgs bundles, respectively, then one obtains moduli spaces
  $$M_{Dol}^{ss} := \mathcal{H}^{ss} // \mathcal{G}^{\mathcal{C}},\qquad M_{Dol}^{s} := \mathcal{H}^s / \mathcal{G}^{\mathcal{C}}$$
  where these quotients are taken in the sense of geometric invariant theory, so orbits whose closures intersect are identified in the moduli space. These moduli spaces are called the Dolbeault moduli spaces. Notice that by setting $\Phi = 0$, one obtains as subsets the moduli spaces of semi-stable and stable holomorphic vector bundles $N_{Dol}^{ss} \subset M_{Dol}^{ss}$ and $N_{Dol}^s \subset M_{Dol}^s$. It is also true that if one defines the moduli space $M_{Dol}^{ps}$ of polystable Higgs bundles then this space is isomorphic to the space of semi-stable Higgs bundles, as every gauge orbit of semi-stable Higgs bundles contains in its closure a unique orbit of polystable Higgs bundles.
- (Flat connections) The group complex gauge transformations also acts on the set $\mathcal{A}$ of flat connections $\nabla$ on the smooth vector bundle $E$. Define the moduli spaces
  $$M_{dR} := \mathcal{A}//\mathcal{G}^{\mathcal{C}},\qquad M_{dR}^* := \mathcal{A}^* / \mathcal{G}^{\mathcal{C}},$$
  where $\mathcal{A}^*$ denotes the subset consisting of irreducible flat connections $\nabla$ which do not split as a direct sum $\nabla = \nabla_1 \oplus \nabla_2$ on some splitting $E=E_1\oplus E_2$ of the smooth vector bundle $E$. These moduli spaces are called the de Rham moduli spaces.
- (Representations) The set of representations $\operatorname{Hom}(\pi_1(X), \operatorname{GL}(r, \Complex))$ of the fundamental group of $X$ is acted on by the general linear group by conjugation of representations. Denote by the superscripts $+$ and $*$ the subsets consisting of semisimple representations and irreducible representations respectively. Then define moduli spaces
  $$M_{B}^+ = \operatorname{Hom}^+(\pi_1(X), \operatorname{GL}(r, \Complex)) // G,\qquad M_{B}^* = \operatorname{Hom}^*(\pi_1(X), \operatorname{GL}(r, \Complex)) / G$$
  of semisimple and irreducible representations, respectively. These quotients are taken in the sense of geometric invariant theory, where two orbits are identified if their closures intersect. These moduli spaces are called the Betti moduli spaces.

== Statement ==
The nonabelian Hodge theorem can be split into two parts. The first part was proved by Donaldson in the case of rank two Higgs bundles over a compact Riemann surface, and in general by Corlette. In general the nonabelian Hodge theorem holds for a smooth complex projective variety $X$, but some parts of the correspondence hold in more generality for compact Kähler manifolds.

Nonabelian Hodge theorem (part 1)—A representation $\rho: \pi_1(X) \to \operatorname{GL}(r,\Complex)$ of the fundamental group is semisimple if and only if the flat vector bundle $E=\hat{X}\times_{\rho} \Complex^r$ admits a harmonic metric. Furthermore the representation is irreducible if and only if the flat vector bundle is irreducible.

The second part of the theorem was proven by Hitchin in the case of rank two Higgs bundles on a compact Riemann surface, and in general by Simpson.

Nonabelian Hodge theorem (part 2)—A Higgs bundle $(E,\Phi)$ has a Hermitian Yang–Mills metric if and only if it is polystable. This metric is a harmonic metric, and therefore arises from a semisimple representation of the fundamental group, if and only if the Chern classes $c_1(E)$ and $c_2(E)$ vanish. Furthermore, a Higgs bundle is stable if and only if it admits an irreducible Hermitian Yang–Mills connection, and therefore comes from an irreducible representation of the fundamental group.

Combined, the correspondence can be phrased as follows:

Nonabelian Hodge theorem—A Higgs bundle (which is topologically trivial) arises from a semisimple representation of the fundamental group if and only if it is polystable. Furthermore it arises from an irreducible representation if and only if it is stable.

=== In terms of moduli spaces ===
The nonabelian Hodge correspondence not only gives a bijection of sets, but homeomorphisms of moduli spaces. Indeed, if two Higgs bundles are isomorphic, in the sense that they can be related by a gauge transformation and therefore correspond to the same point in the Dolbeault moduli space, then the associated representations will also be isomorphic, and give the same point in the Betti moduli space. In terms of the moduli spaces the nonabelian Hodge theorem can be phrased as follows.

Nonabelian Hodge theorem (moduli space version)—There are homeomorphisms $M_{Dol}^{ss} \cong M_{dR} \cong M_B^+$ of moduli spaces which restrict to homeomorphisms $M_{Dol}^s \cong M_{dR}^* \cong M_B^*$.

In general these moduli spaces will be not just topological spaces, but have some additional structure. For example, the Dolbeault moduli space and Betti moduli space $M_{Dol}^{ss}, M_B^+$ are naturally complex algebraic varieties, and where it is smooth, the de Rham moduli space $M_{dR}$ is a Riemannian manifold. On the common locus where these moduli spaces are smooth, the map $M_{dR} \to M_B^+$ is a diffeomorphism, and since $M_B^+$ is a complex manifold on the smooth locus, $M_{dR}$ obtains a compatible Riemannian and complex structure, and is therefore a Kähler manifold.

Similarly, on the smooth locus, the map $M_B^+ \to M_{Dol}^{ss}$ is a diffeomorphism. However, even though the Dolbeault and Betti moduli spaces both have natural complex structures, these are not isomorphic. In fact, if they are denoted $I,J$ (for the associated integrable almost complex structures) then $IJ=-JI$. In particular if one defines a third almost complex structure by $K=IJ$ then $I^2 =J^2 =K^2 = IJK= -\operatorname{Id}$. If one combines these three complex structures with the Riemannian metric coming from $M_{dR}$, then on the smooth locus the moduli spaces become a Hyperkähler manifold.

=== Relation to Hitchin–Kobayashi correspondence and unitary representations ===
If one sets the Higgs field $\Phi$ to zero, then a Higgs bundle is simply a holomorphic vector bundle. This gives an inclusion $N_{Dol}^{ss} \subset M_{Dol}^{ss}$ of the moduli space of semi-stable holomorphic vector bundles into the moduli space of Higgs bundles. The Hitchin–Kobayashi correspondence gives a correspondence between holomorphic vector bundles and Hermitian Yang–Mills connections over compact Kähler manifolds, and can therefore be seen as a special case of the nonabelian Hodge correspondence.

When the underlying vector bundle is topologically trivial, the holonomy of a Hermitian Yang–Mills connection will give rise to a unitary representation of the fundamental group, $\rho:\pi_1(X) \to \operatorname{U}(r)$. The subset of the Betti moduli space corresponding to the unitary representations, denoted $N_B^+$, will get mapped isomorphically onto the moduli space of semi-stable vector bundles $N_{Dol}^{ss}$.

== Examples ==
=== Rank one Higgs bundles on compact Riemann surfaces ===
The special case where the rank of the underlying vector bundle is one gives rise to a simpler correspondence. Firstly, every line bundle is stable, as there are no proper non-zero subsheaves. In this case, a Higgs bundle consists of a pair $(L, \Phi)$ of a holomorphic line bundle and a holomorphic $(1,0)$-form, since the endomorphism of a line bundle are trivial. In particular, the Higgs field is uncoupled from the holomorphic line bundle, so the moduli space $M_{Dol}$ will split as a product, and the one-form automatically satisfies the condition $\Phi\wedge\Phi = 0$. The gauge group of a line bundle is commutative, and so acts trivially on the Higgs field $\Phi$ by conjugation. Thus the moduli space can be identified as a product
$$M_{Dol} = \operatorname{Jac}(X) \times H^0(X, \boldsymbol{\Omega}^1)$$
of the Jacobian variety of $X$, classifying all holomorphic line bundles up to isomorphism, and the vector space $H^0(X, \boldsymbol{\Omega}^1)$ of holomorphic $(1,0)$-forms.

In the case of rank one Higgs bundles on compact Riemann surfaces, one obtains a further description of the moduli space. The fundamental group of a compact Riemann surface, a surface group, is given by
$$\pi_1(X) = \langle a_1,\dots,a_g,b_1,\dots,b_g \mid [a_1,b_1]\cdots[a_g,b_g]=e\rangle$$
where $g$ is the genus of the Riemann surface. The representations of $\pi_1(X)$ into the general linear group $\operatorname{GL}(1,\Complex) = \Complex^*$ are therefore given by $2g$-tuples of non-zero complex numbers:
$$\operatorname{Hom}(\pi_1(X), \Complex^*) = (\Complex^*)^{2g}.$$
Since $\Complex^*$ is abelian, the conjugation on this space is trivial, and the Betti moduli space is $M_B = (\Complex^*)^{2g}$. On the other hand, by Serre duality, the space of holomorphic $(1,0)$-forms is dual to the sheaf cohomology $H^1(X, \mathcal{O}_X)$. The Jacobian variety is an Abelian variety given by the quotient
$$\operatorname{Jac}(X) = \frac{H^1(X,\mathcal{O}_X)}{H^1(X,\Z)},$$
so has tangent spaces given by the vector space $H^1(X,\mathcal{O}_X)$, and cotangent bundle
$$T^* \operatorname{Jac}(X) = \operatorname{Jac}(X) \times H^1(X,\mathcal{O}_X)^* = \operatorname{Jac}(X) \times H^0(X, \boldsymbol{\Omega}^1) = M_{Dol}.$$
That is, the Dolbeault moduli space, the moduli space of holomorphic Higgs line bundles, is simply the cotangent bundle to the Jacobian, the moduli space of holomorphic line bundles. The nonabelian Hodge correspondence therefore gives a diffeomorphism
$$T^* \operatorname{Jac}(X) \cong (\Complex^*)^{2g}$$
which is not a biholomorphism. One can check that the natural complex structures on these two spaces are different, and satisfy the relation $IJ = -JI$, giving a hyperkähler structure on the cotangent bundle to the Jacobian.

== Generalizations ==
It is possible to define the notion of a principal $G$-Higgs bundle for a complex reductive algebraic group $G$, a version of Higgs bundles in the category of principal bundles. There is a notion of a stable principal bundle, and one can define a stable principal $G$-Higgs bundle. A version of the nonabelian Hodge theorem holds for these objects, relating principal $G$-Higgs bundles to representations of the fundamental group into $G$.

== Nonabelian Hodge theory ==
The correspondence between Higgs bundles and representations of the fundamental group can be phrased as a kind of nonabelian Hodge theorem, which is to say, an analogy of the Hodge decomposition of a Kähler manifold, but with coefficients in the nonabelian group $\operatorname{GL}(n,\Complex)$ instead of the abelian group $\Complex$. The exposition here follows the discussion by Oscar Garcia-Prada in the appendix to Wells' Differential Analysis on Complex Manifolds.

=== Hodge decomposition ===
The Hodge decomposition of a compact Kähler manifold decomposes the complex de Rham cohomology into the finer Dolbeault cohomology:

$$H_{dR}^k(X,\Complex) = \bigoplus_{p+q=k} H_{Dol}^{p,q}(X).$$

At degree one this gives a direct sum

$$H^1(X,\Complex) = H^{0,1}(X)\oplus H^{1,0}(X) \cong H^1(X, \mathcal{O}_X) \oplus H^0(X, \boldsymbol{\Omega}^1)$$

where we have applied the Dolbeault theorem to phrase the Dolbeault cohomology in terms of sheaf cohomology of the sheaf of holomorphic $(1,0)$-forms $\boldsymbol{\Omega}^1,$ and the structure sheaf $\mathcal{O}_X$ of holomorphic functions on $X$.

=== Nonabelian cohomology ===
When constructing sheaf cohomology, the coefficient sheaf $\mathcal{F}$ is always a sheaf of abelian groups. This is because for an abelian group, every subgroup is normal, so the quotient group
$$\check{H}^k(X, \mathcal{F}) = Z^k(X, \mathcal{F})/B^k(X, \mathcal{F})$$
of sheaf cocycles by sheaf coboundaries is always well-defined. When the sheaf $\mathcal{F}$ is not abelian, these quotients are not necessarily well-defined, and so sheaf cohomology theories do not exist, except in the following special cases:

- $k=0$: The 0th sheaf cohomology group is always the space of global sections of the sheaf $\mathcal{F}$, so is always well-defined even if $\mathcal{F}$ is nonabelian.
- $k=1$: The 1st sheaf cohomology set is well-defined for a nonabelian sheaf $\mathcal{F}$, but it is not itself a quotient group.
- $k=2$: In some special cases, an analogue of the second degree sheaf cohomology can be defined for nonabelian sheaves using the theory of gerbes.

A key example of nonabelian cohomology occurs when the coefficient sheaf is $\mathcal{GL}(r, \Complex)$, the sheaf of holomorphic functions into the complex general linear group. In this case it is a well-known fact from Čech cohomology that the cohomology set
$$\check{H}^1(X, \mathcal{GL}(r, \Complex))$$
is in one-to-one correspondence with the set of holomorphic vector bundles of rank $r$ on $X$, up to isomorphism. Notice that there is a distinguished holomorphic vector bundle of rank $r$, the trivial vector bundle, so this is actually a cohomology pointed set. In the special case $r=1$ the general linear group is the abelian group $\Complex^*$ of non-zero complex numbers with respect to multiplication. In this case one obtains the group of holomorphic line bundles up to isomorphism, otherwise known as the Picard group.

=== Nonabelian Hodge theorem ===
The first cohomology group $H^1(X,\Complex)$ is isomorphic to the group of homomorphisms from the fundamental group $\pi_1(X)$ to $\Complex$. This can be understood, for example, by applying the Hurewicz theorem. Thus the regular Hodge decomposition mentioned above may be phrased as

$$\operatorname{Hom}(\pi_1(X), \Complex) \cong H^1(X, \mathcal{O}_X) \oplus H^0(X, \boldsymbol{\Omega}^1).$$

The nonabelian Hodge correspondence gives an analogy of this statement of the Hodge theorem for nonabelian cohomology, as follows. A Higgs bundle consists of a pair $(E,\Phi)$ where $E$ is a holomorphic vector bundle, and $\Phi\in H^0(X, \operatorname{End}(E)\otimes \boldsymbol{\Omega}^1)$ is a holomorphic, endomorphism-valued $(1,0)$-form. The holomorphic vector bundle $E$ may be identified with an element of $\check{H}^1(X, \mathcal{GL}(r, \Complex))$ as mentioned above. Thus a Higgs bundle may be thought of as an element of the direct product

$$(E,\Phi) \in \check{H}^1(X, \mathcal{GL}(r, \Complex)) \oplus H^0(X, \operatorname{End}(E)\otimes \boldsymbol{\Omega}^1).$$

The nonabelian Hodge correspondence gives an isomorphism from the moduli space of $\operatorname{GL}(r,\Complex)$-representations of the fundamental group $\pi_1(X)$ to the moduli space of Higgs bundles, which could therefore be written as an isomorphism

$$\operatorname{Rep}(\pi_1(X), \operatorname{GL}(r,\Complex)) \cong \check{H}^1(X, \mathcal{GL}(r, \Complex)) \oplus H^0(X, \operatorname{End}(E)\otimes \boldsymbol{\Omega}^1).$$

This can be seen as an analogy of the regular Hodge decomposition above. The moduli space of representations $\operatorname{Rep}(\pi_1(X), \operatorname{GL}(r,\Complex))$ plays the role of the first cohomology of $X$ with nonabelian coefficients, the cohomology set $\check{H}^1(X, \mathcal{GL}(r,\Complex))$ plays the role of the space $H^1(X,\mathcal{O}_X)$, and the group $H^0(X, \operatorname{End}(E)\otimes \boldsymbol{\Omega}^1)$ plays the role of the holomorphic (1,0)-forms $H^0(X, \boldsymbol{\Omega}^1)$.

The isomorphism here is written $\cong$, but this is not an actual isomorphism of sets, as the moduli space of Higgs bundles is not literally given by the direct sum above, as this is only an analogy.

=== Hodge structure ===
The moduli space $M_{Dol}^{ss}$ of semi-stable Higgs bundles has a natural action of the multiplicative group $\Complex^*$, given by scaling the Higgs field: $\lambda \cdot (E,\Phi) = (E,\lambda \Phi)$ for $\lambda \in \Complex^*$. For abelian cohomology, such a $\Complex^*$ action gives rise to a Hodge structure, which is a generalisation of the Hodge decomposition of the cohomology of a compact Kähler manifold. One way of understanding the nonabelian Hodge theorem is to use the $\Complex^*$ action on the moduli space $M_B^+$ to obtain a Hodge filtration. This can lead to new topological invariants of the underlying manifold $X$. For example, one obtains restrictions on which groups may appear as the fundamental groups of compact Kähler manifolds in this way.
