= Deformed Hermitian Yang–Mills equation =

In mathematics and theoretical physics, and especially gauge theory, the deformed Hermitian Yang–Mills (dHYM) equation is a differential equation describing the equations of motion for a D-brane in the B-model (commonly called a B-brane) of string theory. The equation was derived by Mariño-Minasian-Moore-Strominger in the case of Abelian gauge group (the unitary group $\operatorname{U}(1)$), and by Leung–Yau–Zaslow using mirror symmetry from the corresponding equations of motion for D-branes in the A-model of string theory.

== Definition ==
In this section we present the dHYM equation as explained in the mathematical literature by Collins-Xie-Yau. The deformed Hermitian–Yang–Mills equation is a fully non-linear partial differential equation for a Hermitian metric on a line bundle over a compact Kähler manifold, or more generally for a real $(1,1)$-form. Namely, suppose $(X,\omega)$ is a Kähler manifold and $[\alpha] \in H^{1,1}(X,\mathbb{R})$ is a class. The case of a line bundle consists of setting $[\alpha]=c_1(L)$ where $c_1(L)$ is the first Chern class of a holomorphic line bundle $L\to X$. Suppose that $\dim X = n$ and consider the topological constant

$$\hat z([\omega], [\alpha]) = \int_X (\omega + i \alpha)^n.$$

Notice that $\hat z$ depends only on the class of $\omega$ and $\alpha$. Suppose that $\hat z\ne 0$. Then this is a complex number

$$\hat z([\omega], [\alpha]) = r e^{i \theta}$$

for some real $r>0$ and angle $\theta\in [0,2\pi)$ which is uniquely determined.

Fix a smooth representative differential form $\alpha$ in the class $[\alpha]$. For a smooth function $\phi: X \to \mathbb{R}$ write $\alpha_{\phi} = \alpha + i \partial \bar \partial \phi$, and notice that $[\alpha_{\phi}] = [\alpha]$. The deformed Hermitian Yang–Mills equation for $(X,\omega)$ with respect to $[\alpha]$ is

$$\begin{cases}\operatorname{Im}(e^{-i\theta} (\omega + i \alpha_{\phi})^n) = 0\\
\operatorname{Re}(e^{-i\theta} (\omega + i \alpha_{\phi})^n) > 0.\end{cases}$$

The second condition should be seen as a positivity condition on solutions to the first equation. That is, one looks for solutions to the equation $\operatorname{Im}(e^{-i\theta} (\omega + i \alpha_{\phi})^n) = 0$ such that $\operatorname{Re}(e^{-i\theta} (\omega + i \alpha_{\phi})^n) > 0$. This is in analogy to the related problem of finding Kähler-Einstein metrics by looking for metrics $\omega + i \partial \bar \partial \phi$ solving the Einstein equation, subject to the condition that $\phi$ is a Kähler potential (which is a positivity condition on the form $\omega + i \partial \bar \partial \phi$).

== Discussion ==
=== Relation to Hermitian Yang–Mills equation ===
The dHYM equations can be transformed in several ways to illuminate several key properties of the equations. First, simple algebraic manipulation shows that the dHYM equation may be equivalently written

$$\operatorname{Im}((\omega+i\alpha)^n)=\tan \theta \operatorname{Re}((\omega+i\alpha)^n).$$

In this form, it is possible to see the relation between the dHYM equation and the regular Hermitian Yang–Mills equation. In particular, the dHYM equation should look like the regular HYM equation in the so-called large volume limit. Precisely, one replaces the Kähler form $\omega$ by $k\omega$ for a positive integer $k$, and allows $k\to \infty$. Notice that the phase $\theta_k$ for $(X,k\omega,[\alpha])$ depends on $k$. In fact, $\tan \theta_k = O(k^{-1})$, and we can expand

$$(k\omega + i \alpha)^n = k^n \omega^n + i n k^{n-1} \omega^{n-1}\wedge \alpha + O(k^{n-2}).$$

Here we see that

$$\operatorname{Re}((k\omega + i \alpha)^n) = k^n \omega^n + O(k^{n-2}),\quad \operatorname{Im}((k\omega + i \alpha)^n) = nk^{n-1} \omega^{n-1}\wedge \alpha + O(k^{n-3}),$$

and we see the dHYM equation for $k\omega$ takes the form

$$C k^{n-1} \omega^n + O(k^{n-3}) = n k^{n-1} \omega^{n-1} \wedge \alpha + O(k^{n-3})$$

for some topological constant $C$ determined by $\tan \theta$. Thus we see the leading order term in the dHYM equation is

$$n\omega^{n-1}\wedge \alpha = C \omega^n$$

which is just the HYM equation (replacing $\alpha$ by $F(h)$ if necessary).

=== Local form ===
The dHYM equation may also be written in local coordinates. Fix $p\in X$ and holomorphic coordinates $(z^1,\dots,z^n)$ such that at the point $p$, we have

$$\omega = \sum_{j=1}^n i dz^j \wedge d\bar z^j,\quad \alpha = \sum_{j=1}^n \lambda_j i dz^j \wedge d\bar z^j.$$

Here $\lambda_j \in \mathbb{R}$ for all $j$ as we assumed $\alpha$ was a real form. Define the Lagrangian phase operator to be

$$\Theta_{\omega}(\alpha) = \sum_{j=1}^n \arctan(\lambda_j).$$

Then simple computation shows that the dHYM equation in these local coordinates takes the form

$$\Theta_{\omega}(\alpha) = \phi$$

where $\phi = \theta\mod 2\pi$. In this form one sees that the dHYM equation is fully non-linear and elliptic.

== Solutions ==
It is possible to use algebraic geometry to study the existence of solutions to the dHYM equation, as demonstrated by the work of Collins–Jacob–Yau and Collins–Yau. Suppose that $V\subset X$ is any analytic subvariety of dimension $p$. Define the central charge $Z_V([\alpha])$ by

$$Z_V([\alpha]) = -\int_V e^{-i\omega + \alpha}.$$

When the dimension of $X$ is 2, Collins–Jacob–Yau show that if $\operatorname{Im}(Z_X([\alpha]))>0$, then there exists a solution of the dHYM equation in the class $[\alpha]\in H^{1,1}(X,\mathbb{R})$ if and only if for every curve $C\subset X$ we have

$\operatorname{Im}\left(\frac{Z_C([\alpha])}{Z_X([\alpha])}\right)>0.$

In the specific example where $X=\operatorname{Bl}_p \mathbb{CP}^n$, the blow-up of complex projective space, Jacob-Sheu show that $[\alpha]$ admits a solution to the dHYM equation if and only if $Z_X([\alpha])\ne 0$ and for any $V\subset X$, we similarly have

$\operatorname{Im}\left(\frac{Z_V([\alpha])}{Z_X([\alpha])}\right)>0.$

It has been shown by Gao Chen that in the so-called supercritical phase, where $\frac{(n-2)\pi}{2} < \theta < \frac{n\pi}{2}$, algebraic conditions analogous to those above imply the existence of a solution to the dHYM equation. This is achieved through comparisons between the dHYM and the so-called J-equation in Kähler geometry. The J-equation appears as the *small volume limit* of the dHYM equation, where $\omega$ is replaced by $\varepsilon \omega$ for a small real number $\varepsilon>0$ and one allows $\epsilon\to 0$.

In general it is conjectured that the existence of solutions to the dHYM equation for a class $[\alpha] = c_1(L)$ should be equivalent to the Bridgeland stability of the line bundle $L$. This is motivated both from comparisons with similar theorems in the non-deformed case, such as the famous Kobayashi–Hitchin correspondence which asserts that solutions exist to the HYM equations if and only if the underlying bundle is slope stable. It is also motivated by physical reasoning coming from string theory, which predicts that physically realistic B-branes (those admitting solutions to the dHYM equation for example) should correspond to Π-stability.

== Relation to string theory ==
Superstring theory predicts that spacetime is 10-dimensional, consisting of a Lorentzian manifold of dimension 4 (usually assumed to be Minkowski space or De sitter or anti-De Sitter space) along with a Calabi–Yau manifold $X$ of dimension 6 (which therefore has complex dimension 3). In this string theory open strings must satisfy Dirichlet boundary conditions on their endpoints. These conditions require that the end points of the string lie on so-called D-branes (D for Dirichlet), and there is much mathematical interest in describing these branes.

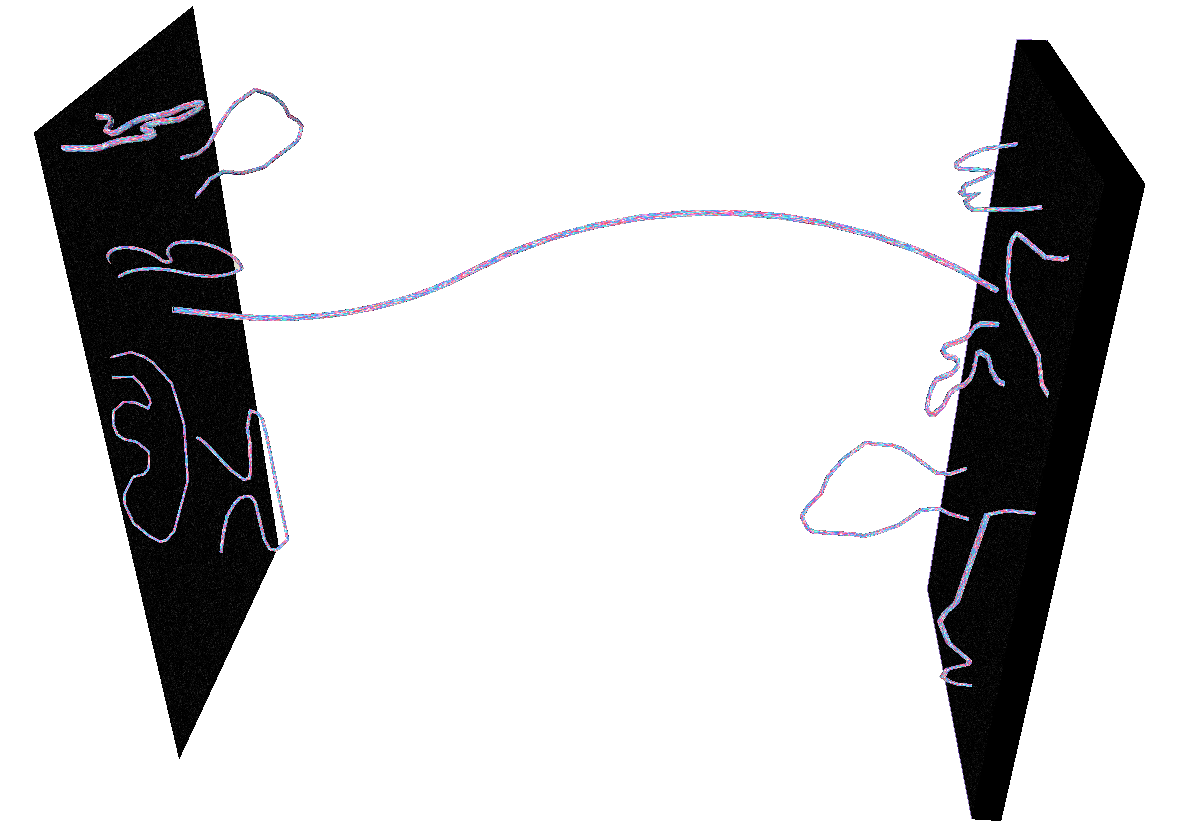
Open strings with endpoints fixed on D-branes

In the B-model of topological string theory, homological mirror symmetry suggests D-branes should be viewed as elements of the derived category of coherent sheaves on the Calabi–Yau 3-fold $X$. This characterisation is abstract, and the case of primary importance, at least for the purpose of phrasing the dHYM equation, is when a B-brane consists of a holomorphic submanifold $Y\subset X$ and a holomorphic vector bundle $E\to Y$ over it (here $Y$ would be viewed as the support of the coherent sheaf $E$ over $X$), possibly with a compatible Chern connection on the bundle.

This Chern connection arises from a choice of Hermitian metric $h$ on $E$, with corresponding connection $\nabla$ and curvature form $F(h)$. Ambient on the spacetime there is also a B-field or Kalb–Ramond field $B$ (not to be confused with the B in B-model), which is the string theoretic equivalent of the classical background electromagnetic field (hence the use of $B$, which commonly denotes the magnetic field strength). Mathematically the B-field is a gerbe or bundle gerbe over spacetime, which means $B$ consists of a collection of two-forms $B_i \in \Omega^2(U_i)$ for an open cover $U_i$ of spacetime, but these forms may not agree on overlaps, where they must satisfy cocycle conditions in analogy with the transition functions of line bundles (0-gerbes). This B-field has the property that when pulled back along the inclusion map $\iota: Y \to X$ the gerbe is trivial, which means the B-field may be identified with a globally defined two-form on $Y$, written $\beta$. The differential form $\alpha$ discussed above in this context is given by $\alpha = F(h) + \beta$, and studying the dHYM equations in the special case where $\alpha = F(h)$ or equivalently $[\alpha] = c_1(L)$ should be seen as turning the B-field off or setting $\beta = 0$, which in string theory corresponds to a spacetime with no background higher electromagnetic field.

The dHYM equation describes the equations of motion for this D-brane $(Y,E)$ in spacetime equipped with a B-field $B$, and is derived from the corresponding equations of motion for A-branes through mirror symmetry. Mathematically the A-model describes D-branes as elements of the Fukaya category of $X$, special Lagrangian submanifolds of $X$ equipped with a flat unitary line bundle over them, and the equations of motion for these A-branes is understood. In the above section the dHYM equation has been phrased for the D6-brane $Y=X$.

== See also ==
- Hermitian Yang–Mills connection
- Yang–Mills connection
- Thomas–Yau conjecture
