= Richard Thomas (mathematician) =

British mathematician

Richard Thomas FRS
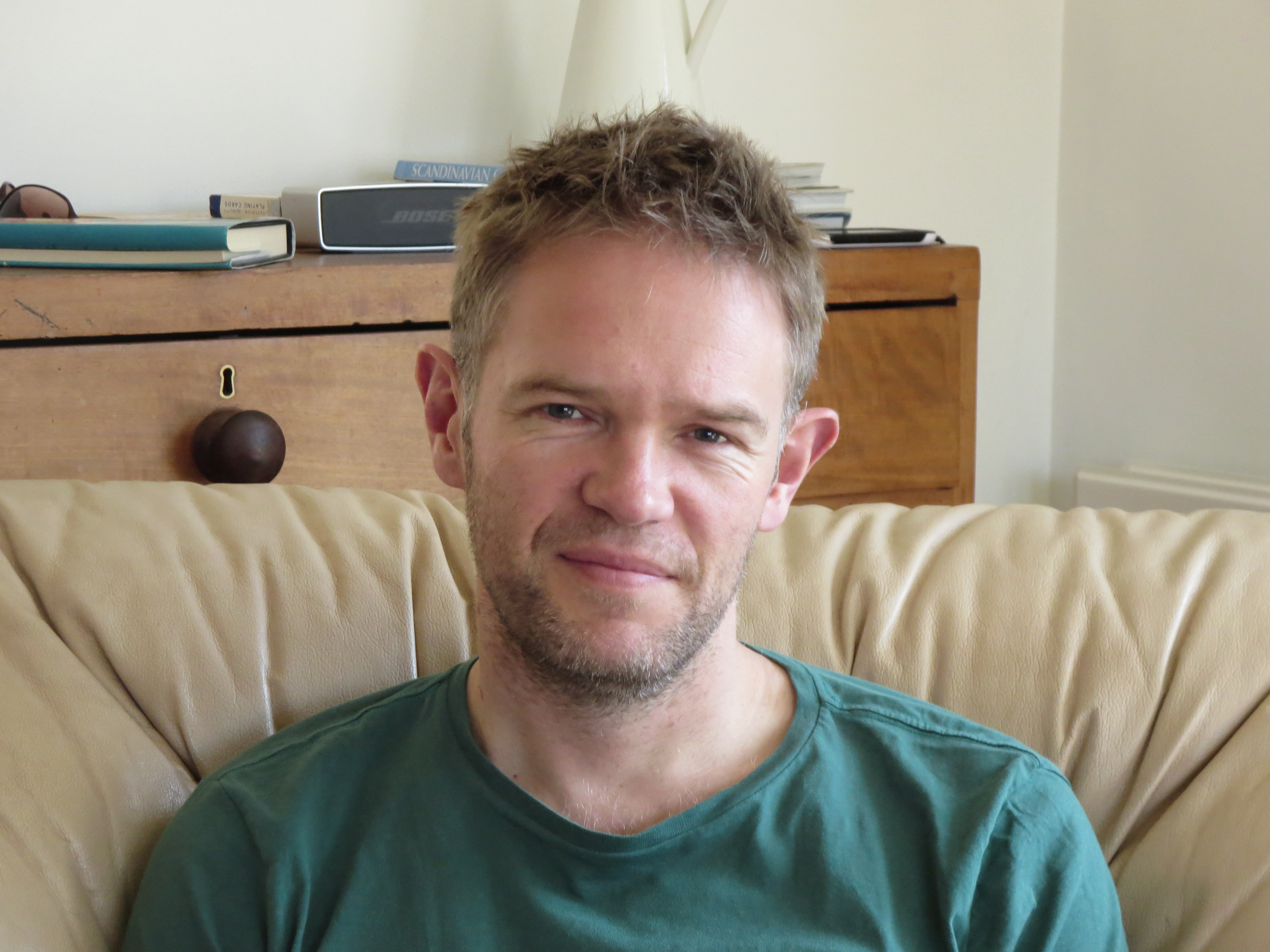
- Born: Richard Paul Winsley Thomas
- Education: University of Oxford
- Known for: Donaldson–Thomas theory; Thomas–Yau conjecture
- Awards: Whitehead Prize (2004); Veblen Prize (2025)
- Scientific career
- Fields: Mathematics
- Workplaces: Imperial College London
- Thesis: Gauge Theory on Calabi-Yau Manifolds (1997)
- Doctoral advisor: Simon Donaldson
- Website: profiles.imperial.ac.uk/richard.thomas

Richard Paul Winsley Thomas FRS is a British mathematician working in several areas of geometry. He is a professor at Imperial College London. He studies moduli problems in algebraic geometry, and ‘mirror symmetry’—a phenomenon in pure mathematics predicted by string theory in theoretical physics.

== Education ==
Thomas obtained his PhD on gauge theory on Calabi–Yau manifolds in 1997 under the supervision of Simon Donaldson at the University of Oxford. In his dissertation research with Donaldson, he defined the Donaldson–Thomas invariants of Calabi–Yau 3-folds, a major topic in geometry and the mathematics of string theory.

== Career and research ==
Before joining Imperial College, he was member of the Institute for Advanced Study in Princeton, New Jersey, and affiliated with Harvard University and the University of Oxford. He was made professor of pure mathematics in 2005.

Thomas has made contributions to algebraic geometry, differential geometry, and symplectic geometry. His doctoral thesis, which introduced the invariants that later became known as Donaldson–Thomas invariants, was published in the Journal of Differential Geometry as `A holomorphic Casson invariant for Calabi-Yau 3-folds, and bundles on K3 fibrations'. Motivated by homological mirror symmetry, he produced braid group actions on derived categories of coherent sheaves in joint work with Paul Seidel. With Shing-Tung Yau he formulated a conjecture (now known as the Thomas–Yau conjecture) concerning the existence of a special Lagrangian in the Hamiltonian deformation class of a fixed Lagrangian submanifold of a Calabi–Yau manifold. Together with Rahul Pandharipande he formulated a refinement of the Donaldson–Thomas invariants for the special case of curve counting, the Pandharipande–Thomas (PT) stable pair invariants. With Martijn Kool and Vivek Shende, he used the PT invariants to prove the Göttsche conjecture—a classical algebro-geometric problem going back more than a century. With Davesh Maulik and Pandharipande he proved the Katz–Klemm–Vafa (KKV) conjecture, establishing links between the Gromov–Witten theory of K3 surfaces and modular forms. His collaboration with Daniel Huybrechts led to contributions to the deformation theory of complexes. With Nick Addington he established a compatibility result for two rationality conjectures on cubic fourfolds.

He coauthored a book on mirror symmetry. Thomas also wrote expository notes on derived categories, curve counting, and homological projective duality. He appeared in the documentary film 'Thinking space' by Heidi Morstang. Thomas has played an important part in promoting geometry in the UK, encouraging younger mathematicians, and in bringing more geometry to Imperial college: "[...] There was little geometry in Imperial then, but now, thanks largely to the drive of my colleague Richard Thomas, we have one of the main centres for research in this area." - Simon Donaldson

== Awards and honours ==
In 2004, Thomas was awarded the London Mathematical Society's Whitehead Prize and the Philip Leverhulme Prize, in 2010 the Royal Society Wolfson Research Merit Award. From the Whitehead prize citation:

"Thomas has made seminal contributions across an unusually broad range of topics.

Much of his work is related to mirror symmetry and Calabi–Yau geometry, and thus has an important bearing on exciting contemporary interactions with mathematical physics. [...] This involved the combination of deep, original insights and

sophisticated technical proofs that is characteristic of Thomas’s work."

In 2010 he also was invited speaker for the algebraic geometry section at the International Congress of Mathematicians in Hyderabad, where he delivered a lecture on mirror symmetry. Thomas was elected a Fellow of the Royal Society (FRS) in 2015.

His contributions to algebraic geometry led to his election to the 2018 class of fellows of the American Mathematical Society. For 2025 he was awarded the Oswald Veblen Prize in Geometry, shared with Soheyla Feyzbakhsh.
