= Kobayashi–Hitchin correspondence =

Vector bundles theorem

In differential geometry, algebraic geometry, and gauge theory, the Kobayashi–Hitchin correspondence (or Donaldson–Uhlenbeck–Yau theorem) relates stable vector bundles over a complex manifold to Einstein–Hermitian vector bundles. The correspondence is named after Shoshichi Kobayashi and Nigel Hitchin, who independently conjectured in the 1980s that the moduli spaces of stable vector bundles and Einstein–Hermitian vector bundles over a complex manifold were essentially the same.

This was proven by Simon Donaldson for projective algebraic surfaces and later for projective algebraic manifolds, by Karen Uhlenbeck and Shing-Tung Yau for compact Kähler manifolds, and independently by Buchdahl for non-Kähler compact surfaces, and by Jun Li and Yau for arbitrary compact complex manifolds.

The theorem can be considered a vast generalisation of the Narasimhan–Seshadri theorem concerned with the case of compact Riemann surfaces, and has been influential in the development of differential geometry, algebraic geometry, and gauge theory since the 1980s. In particular the Hitchin–Kobayashi correspondence inspired conjectures leading to the nonabelian Hodge correspondence for Higgs bundles, as well as the Yau–Tian–Donaldson conjecture about the existence of Kähler–Einstein metrics on Fano varieties, and the Thomas–Yau conjecture about existence of special Lagrangians inside isotopy classes of Lagrangian submanifolds of a Calabi–Yau manifold.

== History ==
In 1965, M. S. Narasimhan and C. S. Seshadri proved the Narasimhan–Seshadri theorem, which relates stable holomorphic (or algebraic) vector bundles over compact Riemann surfaces (or non-singular projective algebraic curves), to projective unitary representations of the fundamental group of the Riemann surface. It was realised in the 1970s by Michael Atiyah, Raoul Bott, Hitchin and others that such representation theory of the fundamental group could be understood in terms of Yang–Mills connections, notions arising out of then-contemporary mathematical physics. Inspired by the Narasimhan–Seshadri theorem, around this time a folklore conjecture formed that slope polystable vector bundles admit Hermitian Yang–Mills connections. This is partially due to the argument of Fedor Bogomolov and the success of Yau's work on constructing global geometric structures in Kähler geometry. This conjecture was first shared explicitly by Kobayashi and Hitchin independently in the early 1980s.

The explicit relationship between Yang–Mills connections and stable vector bundles was made concrete in the early 1980s. A direct correspondence when the dimension of the base complex manifold is one was explained in the work of Atiyah and Bott in 1982 on the Yang–Mills equations over compact Riemann surfaces, and in Donaldson's new proof of the Narasimhan–Seshadri theorem from the perspective of gauge theory in 1983. In that setting, a Hermitian Yang–Mills connection could be simply understood as a (projectively) flat connection over the Riemann surface. The notion of a Hermitian–Einstein connection for a vector bundle over a higher dimensional complex manifold was distilled by Kobayashi in 1980, and in 1982 he showed in general that a vector bundle admitting such a connection was slope stable in the sense of Mumford.

The more difficult direction of proving the existence of Hermite–Einstein metrics on stable holomorphic vector bundles over complex manifolds of dimension larger than one quickly followed in the 1980s. Soon after providing a new proof of the Narasimhan–Seshadri theorem in complex dimension one, Donaldson proved existence for algebraic surfaces in 1985. The following year Uhlenbeck–Yau proved existence for arbitrary compact Kähler manifolds using a continuity method. Shortly after that Donaldson provided a second proof tailored specifically to the case of projective algebraic manifolds using the theory of determinant bundles and the Quillen metric. Due to their work, the Kobayashi–Hitchin correspondence is often also referred to as the Donaldson–Uhlenbeck–Yau theorem. In 2019 Karen Uhlenbeck was awarded the Abel Prize in part for her work on the existence of Hermite–Einstein metrics, as well as her contributions to the key analytical techniques that underpin the proof of the theorem.

In the later 1980s, attention turned to establishing the correspondence not just in the case of compact Kähler manifolds, but also for arbitrary compact complex manifolds. There is difficulty in this setting in even defining the notion of stability. For non-Kähler manifolds one must use a Gauduchon metric to define stability, but this is no restriction as every metric on a compact complex manifold is conformal to a Gauduchon metric. In 1987 existence on arbitrary compact complex surfaces was shown by Buchdahl, and shortly after for arbitrary compact complex manifolds by Li–Yau.

== Statement ==
The Kobayashi–Hitchin correspondence concerns the existence of Hermitian Yang–Mills connections (or Hermite–Einstein metrics) on holomorphic vector bundles over compact complex manifolds. In this section the precise notions will be presented for the setting of compact Kähler manifolds.

=== Stable vector bundles ===
The notion of stability was introduced in algebraic geometry by Mumford in his work on geometric invariant theory, with a view to constructing moduli spaces of various geometric objects. Mumford applied this new theory vector bundles to develop a notion of slope stability.

Define the degree of a holomorphic vector bundle $E\to (X,\omega)$ over a compact Kähler manifold to be the integer

$$\mathrm{deg} (E) := (c_1(E) \cup [\omega]^{n-1})[X]$$

where $c_1(E)$ is the first Chern class of $E$. The slope of $E$ is the rational number $\mu(E)$ defined by

$$\mu(E) := \frac{\mathrm{deg}(E)}{\mathrm{rank}(E)}.$$

It is possible to extend the definition of slope to any analytic coherent sheaf over $(X,\omega)$. Namely in the algebraic setting the rank and degree of a coherent sheaf are encoded in the coefficients of its Hilbert polynomial, and the expressions for these quantities may be extended in a straightforward way to the setting of Kähler manifolds that aren't projective by replacing the ample line bundle by the Kähler class and intersection pairings by integrals.

A holomorphic vector bundle $E\to (X,\omega)$ is said to be slope stable (resp. slope semistable) if for all proper, non-zero coherent subsheaves $\mathcal{F}\subset E$ with $0 < \operatorname{rk}(\mathcal{F}) < \operatorname{rk}(E)$, the following inequality is satisfied:

$$\mu(\mathcal{F}) < \mu(E) \quad \text{(resp. } \le \text{)}.$$

A vector bundle is slope polystable if it is isomorphic to a direct sum of stable holomorphic vector bundles of the same slope. A vector bundle is slope unstable if it is not slope semistable.

=== Hermitian Yang–Mills connection ===
The notion of a Hermitian Yang–Mills connection is a specification of a Yang–Mills connection to the case of a Hermitian vector bundle over a complex manifold. It is possible to phrase the definition in terms of either the Hermitian metric itself, or its associated Chern connection, and the two notions are essentially equivalent up to gauge transformation. Given a Hermitian vector bundle $(E,h)\to (X,\omega)$ over a compact Kähler manifold, a Hermitian Yang–Mills connection is a unitary connection $A$ for the Hermitian metric $h$ which satisfies

$$\begin{cases}
F_A^{0,2} = 0\\
\Lambda_{\omega} F_A = \lambda(E) \operatorname{Id}_E.
\end{cases}$$

The condition that $F_A^{0,2}=0$ implies that the differential operator $\nabla_A^{0,1}$ is a Dolbeault operator for a holomorphic structure on the Hermitian vector bundle $(E,h)$, and that $A$ itself is the Chern connection for this holomorphic structure. The constant $\lambda(E)\in \mathbb{C}$ depends only on the topology of $E$, and can be computed to be

$$\lambda(E) = -\frac{2\pi i}{(n-1)! \mathrm{vol}(X)} \mu(E).$$

If one instead starts with a holomorphic vector bundle $E\to (X,\omega)$ and varies the choice of Hermitian metric, then a solution of the above equations, where $A$ is the Chern connection of the Hermitian metric, is called a Hermite–Einstein metric.

=== Correspondence ===
Here we give the statement of the Kobayashi–Hitchin correspondence for arbitrary compact complex manifolds, a case where the above definitions of stability and special metrics can be readily extended.

Theorem (Donaldson–Uhlenbeck–Yau, Buchdahl, Li–Yau): A holomorphic vector bundle $E\to (X,\omega)$ over a compact complex manifold with metric 2-form $\omega$ admits a Hermite–Einstein metric if and only if it is slope polystable.

If one instead restricts to irreducible holomorphic vector bundles, then slope polystability may be replaced with slope stability. The Kobayashi–Hitchin correspondence does not just imply a bijection of sets of slope polystable vector bundles and Hermite–Einstein metrics, but an isomorphism of moduli spaces. Namely, two polystable holomorphic vector bundles are biholomorphic if and only if there exists a gauge transformation taking the corresponding Hermite–Einstein metrics from one to the other, and the map $h\mapsto E$ taking a Hermite–Einstein metric to its corresponding polystable vector bundle is continuous with respect to taking sequences of Hermitian metrics and holomorphic vector bundles in the appropriate topologies. Thus one may state the correspondence as follows:

Theorem (Moduli space version): There is a homeomorphism of the moduli space of polystable holomorphic vector bundles over $(X,\omega)$ with fixed underlying smooth structure $E\to (X,\omega)$ up to biholomorphism, and the moduli space of Hermite–Einstein metrics on the complex vector bundle $E$ up to gauge transformation.

One direction of the proof of the Kobayashi–Hitchin correspondence, the stability of a holomorphic vector bundle admitting a Hermite–Einstein metric, is a relatively straightforward application of the principle in Hermitian geometry that curvature decreases in holomorphic subbundles. Kobayashi and Lübke provided proofs of this direction. The main difficulty in this direction is to show stability with respect to coherent subsheaves which are not locally free, and to do this Kobayashi proved a vanishing theorem for sections of Hermite–Einstein vector bundles.

The more complicated direction of showing the existence of a Hermite–Einstein metric on a slope polystable vector bundle requires sophisticated techniques from geometric analysis. Many of these techniques build on the ideas developed by Yau in his proof of the Calabi conjecture, as well as on the important work of Uhlenbeck on harmonic maps in the 1970s, and her important analytical results about Yang–Mills connections from the early 1980s. Uhlenbeck and Yau proved the general case of the correspondence by applying a continuity method and showing that the obstruction to the completion of this continuity method can be characterised precisely by an analytic coherent subsheaf with which slope-destabilises the vector bundle. These techniques were built on by Buchdahl and Li–Yau in the setting where the 2-form $\omega$ is not closed, so that the compact complex manifold is not Kähler.

== Generalisations and influence ==
The Kobayashi–Hitchin correspondence was one of the first instances of a general principle that has come to dominate geometry research since its proof: extremal objects in differential geometry correspond to stable objects in algebraic geometry. Many results have been proven either as extensions or variations of the Kobayashi–Hitchin correspondence, or by direct analogy with the correspondence to seemingly disparate parts of geometry, and all of these results follow along this same principle. Here a summary of these generalisations or related results is given:

=== Generalisations ===
- A form of the Kobayashi–Hitchin correspondence holds for strictly slope semistable vector bundles which are not polystable. On such vector bundles one may prove the existence of a so-called approximate Hermite–Einstein metric, which is a family $h_{\varepsilon}$ of Hermitian metrics for small $\varepsilon>0$ such that $\|\Lambda_{\omega} F(h_\varepsilon) - \lambda(E) \operatorname{Id}_E\|_{L^2} < \varepsilon$ for every $\varepsilon$.
- The Kobayashi–Hitchin correspondence has been generalised by Bando–Siu to singular holomorphic vector bundles, otherwise known as reflexive sheaves. This involves defining a notion of singular Hermite–Einstein metrics on such sheaves and has been influential in the developments of singular Kähler–Einstein metrics over singular Fano varieties.
- The correspondence was generalised to the case of Higgs bundles by Hitchin, Carlos Simpson, Donaldson, and Kevin Corlette. Namely Hitchin proved a partial analogue of the Kobayashi–Hitchin correspondence for Higgs bundles over a compact Riemann surface, and Donaldson provided some work on harmonic representations which completed this correspondence. This was then vastly generalised by Simpson to the case of Higgs bundles over arbitrary compact Kähler manifolds, and Corlette proved the corresponding results about harmonic representations in this case. This has come to be known as the nonabelian Hodge correspondence, and has deep relations to mirror symmetry and the P=W conjecture of Tamas Hausel, as well as to integrable systems. The nonabelian Hodge correspondence implies the Kobayashi–Hitchin correspondence for compact Kähler manifolds.
- The correspondence was generalised to Hermite–Einstein metrics on holomorphic principal bundles with reductive structure group, admitting a compatible reduction of structure group to a maximal compact subgroup. Annamalai Ramanathan first defined the notion of a stable principal bundle, and in general the correspondence was proven by Anchouche and Biswas. A version of the correspondence for Higgs-principal bundles is also known.
- David Gieseker introduced a notion of stability, Gieseker stability, which shares many formal properties with slope stability. Gieseker stability asks for inequalities of entire (normalised) Hilbert polynomials for large argument, whereas slope stability asks just for an inequality of the leading order coefficients. Thus Gieseker stability can be seen as a generalisation of slope stability, and indeed there is a chain of implications

slope stable ⇒ Gieseker stable ⇒ Gieseker semistable ⇒ slope semistable.

Gieseker stability is a notion of stability for vector bundles that arises directly out of geometric invariant theory, and has subsequently had significant impact in algebraic geometry, where it is used to form moduli spaces of sheaves. A generalisation of the Kobayashi–Hitchin correspondence was proven for Gieseker stable vector bundles by Conan Leung, who associated to each Gieseker stable vector bundle a so-called almost Hermite–Einstein metric. These are special Hermitian metrics which satisfy a polynomial version of the differential equation defining a Hermite–Einstein metric, and are in fact special classes of approximate Hermite–Einstein metrics.

- In 2001 Álvarez-Cónsul and García-Prada proved a vast generalisation of the Kobayashi–Hitchin correspondence to twisted quiver bundles over compact Kähler manifolds, which are families of holomorphic vector bundles equipped with auxiliary fields and bundle homomorphisms between them. This includes as special cases the regular Kobayashi–Hitchin correspondence, as well as the nonabelian Hodge correspondence and various version of the Kobayashi–Hitchin correspondence for dimensional reductions of the Yang–Mills equations.

=== Influence ===
In addition to admitting many direct or vast generalisations, the Kobayashi–Hitchin correspondence has also served as a guiding result for other correspondences which do not directly fit into the framework of Hermitian metrics on vector bundles.

- There is a correspondence in Seiberg–Witten theory inspired by the Kobayashi–Hitchin correspondence, which identifies solutions of the Seiberg–Witten equations over a Kähler surface, monopoles, with certain divisors. This has been used to compute examples of Seiberg–Witten invariants of four-manifolds and recover results known from Donaldson theory.
- Yau conjectured in 1993 that there should exist a notion of stability for algebraic varieties which would uniquely characterise the existence of Kähler–Einstein metrics on smooth Fano varieties, and that this notion of stability should be an analogue of slope stability of vector bundles. Tian Gang gave a precise definition of such a stability notion, called K-stability, which was rephrased in a purely algebro-geometric way by Donaldson. The conjecture that such K-polystable Fano manifolds are in correspondence with Kähler–Einstein metrics was proven by Chen–Donaldson–Sun.
- Building on the conjecture of Yau, Donaldson conjectured that more generally any smooth K-polystable projective variety should admit a constant scalar curvature Kähler metric. This generalisation of the conjecture for Fano manifolds is known as the Yau–Tian–Donaldson conjecture, and is still open in general. It has been resolved in the case of toric varieties of complex dimension two. Many of the techniques developed to understand the Kobayashi–Hitchin correspondence have been applied to the setting of varieties in order to try and understand the YTD conjecture. Namely the use of the Kähler–Ricci flow as an analogy of the Yang–Mills flow, and of the Calabi functional and K-energy functional in comparison to the Yang–Mills functional and Donaldson functional. The study of optimal degenerations of projective varieties with respect to K-stability has also been heavily inspired by the study of the Harder–Narasimhan filtration of a holomorphic vector bundle, and the singular behaviour of metrics on varieties is studied through analogy with how Hermitian metrics degenerate along the Yang–Mills flow on strictly semistable holomorphic vector bundles.
- The Thomas–Yau conjecture in symplectic geometry proposes a stability condition which should precisely characterise when an isotopy class of Lagrangian submanifolds of a Calabi–Yau manifold admits a special Lagrangian submanifold as a representative. This conjecture can be seen as a direct analogy to the Kobayashi–Hitchin correspondence, where the isotopy class is replaced by a gauge orbit inside the space of Hermitian vector bundles, and the special Lagrangian condition is replaced with the Hermite–Einstein condition. One characterisation of the required stability condition was proposed by Dominic Joyce to come from Bridgeland stability conditions, and a mirror version of the result for the so-called deformed Hermitian Yang–Mills equation has been proven by Gao Chen.

== Applications ==
The Kobayashi–Hitchin correspondence has found a variety of important applications throughout algebraic geometry, differential geometry, and differential topology. By providing two alternative descriptions of the moduli space of stable holomorphic vector bundles over a complex manifold, one algebraic in nature and the other analytic, many important results about such moduli spaces have been able to be proved. The most spectacular of these has been to the study of invariants of four-manifolds and more generally to algebraic varieties, through Donaldson–Thomas theory. In particular, the moduli space of Hermite–Einstein vector bundles comes naturally equipped with a Riemannian structure, given by a Weil–Peterson-type metric on the moduli space. Combining this geometric structure with the natural algebraic compactifications of the moduli space arising out of the Kobayashi–Hitchin correspondence, given by the moduli spaces of slope semistable or Gieseker semistable sheaves, allows one to integrate characteristic classes over the moduli space to obtain invariants of the original complex manifold. This is most famously used in Donaldson theory, where invariants of smooth four-manifolds are obtained. Similar techniques have been used in Seiberg–Witten theory. In higher dimensions, Donaldson–Thomas theory and integration over virtual fundamental classes was developed in analogy with the dual descriptions of moduli spaces of sheaves that is afforded by the Kobayashi–Hitchin correspondence. This is one sense in which the correspondence has had lasting impacts in enumerative geometry.
