= Stable principal bundle =

In mathematics, and especially differential geometry and algebraic geometry, a stable principal bundle is a generalisation of the notion of a stable vector bundle to the setting of principal bundles. The concept of stability for principal bundles was introduced by Annamalai Ramanathan for the purpose of defining the moduli space of G-principal bundles over a Riemann surface, a generalisation of earlier work by David Mumford and others on the moduli spaces of vector bundles.

Many statements about the stability of vector bundles can be translated into the language of stable principal bundles. For example, the analogue of the Kobayashi–Hitchin correspondence for principal bundles, that a holomorphic principal bundle over a compact Kähler manifold admits a Hermite–Einstein connection if and only if it is polystable, was shown to be true in the case of projective manifolds by Subramanian and Ramanathan, and for arbitrary compact Kähler manifolds by Anchouche and Biswas.

== Definition ==
The essential definition of stability for principal bundles was made by Ramanathan, but applies only to the case of Riemann surfaces. In this section we state the definition as appearing in the work of Anchouche and Biswas which is valid over any Kähler manifold, and indeed makes sense more generally for algebraic varieties. This reduces to Ramanathan's definition in the case the manifold is a Riemann surface.

Let $G$ be a connected reductive algebraic group over the complex numbers $\mathbb{C}$. Let $(X,\omega)$ be a compact Kähler manifold of complex dimension $n$. Suppose $P\to X$ is a holomorphic principal $G$-bundle over $X$. Holomorphic here means that the transition functions for $P$ vary holomorphically, which makes sense as the structure group is a complex Lie group. The principal bundle $P$ is called stable (resp. semi-stable) if for every reduction of structure group $\sigma: U \to P/Q$ for $Q\subset G$ a maximal parabolic subgroup where $U\subset X$ is some open subset with the codimension $\operatorname{codim}(X\backslash U) \ge 2$, we have

$$\deg \sigma^* T_{\operatorname{rel}} P/Q > 0 \quad (\text{resp. }\ge 0).$$

Here $T_{\operatorname{rel}} P/Q$ is the relative tangent bundle of the fibre bundle $\left.P/Q\right|_U \to U$ otherwise known as the vertical bundle of $T (\left.P/Q\right|_U)$. Recall that the degree of a vector bundle (or coherent sheaf) $F\to X$ is defined to be

$$\operatorname{deg}(F) := \int_X c_1(F) \wedge \omega^{n-1},$$

where $c_1(F)$ is the first Chern class of $F$. In the above setting the degree is computed for a bundle defined over $U$ inside $X$, but since the codimension of the complement of $U$ is bigger than two, the value of the integral will agree with that over all of $X$.

Notice that in the case where $\dim X = 1$, that is where $X$ is a Riemann surface, by assumption on the codimension of $U$ we must have that $U=X$, so it is enough to consider reductions of structure group over the entirety of $X$, $\sigma: X \to P/Q$.

== Relation to stability of vector bundles ==
Given a principal $G$-bundle for a complex Lie group $G$ there are several natural vector bundles one may associate to it.

Firstly if $G=\operatorname{GL}(n,\mathbb{C})$, the general linear group, then the standard representation of $\operatorname{GL}(n,\mathbb{C})$ on $\mathbb{C}^n$ allows one to construct the associated bundle $E = P \times_{\operatorname{GL}(n,\mathbb{C})} \mathbb{C}^n$. This is a holomorphic vector bundle over $X$, and the above definition of stability of the principal bundle is equivalent to slope stability of $E$. The essential point is that a maximal parabolic subgroup $Q\subset \operatorname{GL}(n,\mathbb{C})$ corresponds to a choice of flag $0 \subset W \subset \mathbb{C}^n$, where $W$ is invariant under the subgroup $Q$. Since the structure group of $P$ has been reduced to $Q$, and $Q$ preserves the vector subspace $W\subset \mathbb{C}^n$, one may take the associated bundle $F = P\times_Q W$, which is a sub-bundle of $E$ over the subset $U\subset X$ on which the reduction of structure group is defined, and therefore a subsheaf of $E$ over all of $X$. It can then be computed that

$$\deg \sigma^* T_{\operatorname{rel}} P/Q = \mu (E) - \mu(F)$$

where $\mu$ denotes the slope of the vector bundles.

When the structure group is not $G=\operatorname{GL}(n, \mathbb{C})$ there is still a natural associated vector bundle to $P$, the adjoint bundle $\operatorname{ad} P$, with fibre given by the Lie algebra $\mathfrak{g}$ of $G$. The principal bundle $P$ is semistable if and only if the adjoint bundle $\operatorname{ad} P$ is slope semistable, and furthermore if $P$ is stable, then $\operatorname{ad} P$ is slope polystable. Again the key point here is that for a parabolic subgroup $Q\subset G$, one obtains a parabolic subalgebra $\mathfrak{q} \subset \mathfrak{g}$ and can take the associated subbundle. In this case more care must be taken because the adjoint representation of $G$ on $\mathfrak{g}$ is not always faithful or irreducible, the latter condition hinting at why stability of the principal bundle only leads to polystability of the adjoint bundle (because a representation that splits as a direct sum would lead to the associated bundle splitting as a direct sum).

== Generalisations ==
Just as one can generalise a vector bundle to the notion of a Higgs bundle, it is possible to formulate a definition of a principal $G$-Higgs bundle. The above definition of stability for principal bundles generalises to these objects by requiring the reductions of structure group are compatible with the Higgs field of the principal Higgs bundle. It was shown by Anchouche and Biswas that the analogue of the nonabelian Hodge correspondence for Higgs vector bundles is true for principal $G$-Higgs bundles in the case where the base manifold $(X,\omega)$ is a complex projective variety.
