= Stable vector bundle =

In mathematics, a stable vector bundle is a (holomorphic or algebraic) vector bundle that is stable in the sense of geometric invariant theory. Any holomorphic vector bundle may be built from stable ones using Harder–Narasimhan filtration. Stable bundles were defined by David Mumford in Mumford (1963) and later built upon by David Gieseker, Fedor Bogomolov, Thomas Bridgeland and many others.

== Motivation ==
On a smooth projective variety, line bundles of given numerical invariants are parametrised over a well-behaved moduli space (isomorphic to the Picard variety). This space is, in particular, a proper and separated scheme of finite type, thus lending itself to algebro-geometric analysis. Similar considerations fail when naively parametrising vector bundles of higher rank.

As an example, consider the moduli of vector bundles of rank $r=2$ and first Chern class $c_1=0$ on the complex projective line $\mathbb{P}^1$. If they were to form a separated moduli space, the valuative criterion would imply that any family over the punctured line $\mathbb{C}^\ast$ can be completed to at most one family over $\mathbb{C}$. But it is straightforward to construct a family that admits two non-isomorphic completions.

Indeed consider the constant family assigning each $t\in \mathbb{C}^\ast$ to the bundle $V_t\simeq \mathcal{O}\oplus\mathcal{O}$. Tensoring the Euler sequence of $\mathbb{P}^1$ by $\mathcal{O}(1)$ gives a non-split exact sequence$0 \to \mathcal{O}(-1) \to \mathcal{O}\oplus \mathcal{O} \to \mathcal{O}(1) \to 0$, and hence this family can be described by saying $V_t$ is the extension corresponding to $1\in \mathbb{C}\simeq \operatorname{Ext}^1(\mathcal{O}(1),\mathcal{O}(-1))$. Likewise, assigning $t\in \mathbb{C}^\ast$ to the extension corresponding to $t\in \operatorname{Ext}^1(\mathcal{O}(1),\mathcal{O}(-1))$ furnishes another family $W_t\simeq \mathcal{O}\oplus \mathcal{O}$. The two families are isomorphic, where the isomorphism $V_t\to W_t$ is induced by the automorphism $\mathcal{O}(-1)\to \mathcal{O}(-1)$ given by multiplication by $t$ - that is, we have two equivalent descriptions of the same family.

When naturally completed over $\mathbb{C}$, the first description continues to yield the extension $V_0=\mathcal{O}\oplus \mathcal{O}$ corresponding to $1\in \operatorname{Ext}^1(\mathcal{O}(1),\mathcal{O}(-1))$. The second description, on the other hands, yields the split extension $W_0\simeq \mathcal{O}(-1)\oplus\mathcal{O}(1)$ corresponding to $t=0\in \operatorname{Ext}^1(\mathcal{O}(1),\mathcal{O}(-1))$. The two bundles, and hence the two completions, are non-isomorphic.

The notion of stability navigates this issue by restricting the class of bundles that may appear in the moduli space, with the upshot of preserving desirable algebro-geometric properties.

== Stable vector bundles over curves ==
A slope of a holomorphic vector bundle W over a nonsingular algebraic curve (or over a Riemann surface) is a rational number μ(W) = deg(W)/rank(W). A bundle W is stable if and only if

$$\mu(V) < \mu(W)$$

for all proper non-zero subbundles V of W and is semistable if

$$\mu(V) \le \mu(W)$$

for all proper non-zero subbundles V of W. Informally this says that a bundle is stable if it is "more ample" than any proper subbundle, and is unstable if it contains a "more ample" subbundle.

If W and V are semistable vector bundles and μ(W) >μ(V), then there are no nonzero maps W → V.

Mumford proved that the moduli space of stable bundles of given rank and degree over a nonsingular curve is a quasiprojective algebraic variety. The cohomology of the moduli space of stable vector bundles over a curve was described by Harder & Narasimhan (1975) using algebraic geometry over finite fields and Atiyah & Bott (1983) using Narasimhan-Seshadri approach.

== Stable vector bundles in higher dimensions ==
If X is a smooth projective variety of dimension m and H is a hyperplane section, then a vector bundle (or a torsion-free sheaf) W is called stable (or sometimes Gieseker stable) if

$$\frac{\chi(V(nH))}{\hbox{rank}(V)} < \frac{\chi(W(nH))}{\hbox{rank}(W)}\text{ for }n\text{ large}$$

for all proper non-zero subbundles (or subsheaves) V of W, where χ denotes the Euler characteristic of an algebraic vector bundle and the vector bundle V(nH) means the n-th twist of V by H. W is called semistable if the above holds with < replaced by ≤.

== Slope stability ==
For bundles on curves the stability defined by slopes and by growth of Hilbert polynomial coincide. In higher dimensions, these two notions are different and have different advantages. Gieseker stability has an interpretation in terms of geometric invariant theory, while μ-stability has better properties for tensor products, pullbacks, etc.

Let X be a smooth projective variety of dimension n, H its hyperplane section. A slope of a vector bundle (or, more generally, a torsion-free coherent sheaf) E with respect to H is a rational number defined as

$$\mu(E) := \frac{c_1(E) \cdot H^{n-1}}{\operatorname{rk}(E)}$$

where c_{1} is the first Chern class. The dependence on H is often omitted from the notation.

A torsion-free coherent sheaf E is μ-semistable if for any nonzero subsheaf F ⊆ E the slopes satisfy the inequality μ(F) ≤ μ(E). It's μ-stable if, in addition, for any nonzero subsheaf F ⊆ E of smaller rank the strict inequality μ(F) < μ(E) holds. This notion of stability may be called slope stability, μ-stability, occasionally Mumford stability or Takemoto stability.

For a vector bundle E the following chain of implications holds: E is μ-stable ⇒ E is stable ⇒ E is semistable ⇒ E is μ-semistable.

== Harder-Narasimhan filtration ==
Let E be a vector bundle over a smooth projective curve X. Then there exists a unique filtration by subbundles

$$0 = E_0 \subset E_1 \subset \ldots \subset E_{r+1} = E$$

such that the associated graded components F_{i} := E_{i+1}/E_{i} are semistable vector bundles and the slopes decrease, μ(F_{i}) > μ(F_{i+1}). This filtration was introduced in Harder & Narasimhan (1975) and is called the Harder-Narasimhan filtration. Two vector bundles with isomorphic associated grades are called S-equivalent.

On higher-dimensional varieties the filtration also always exist and is unique, but the associated graded components may no longer be bundles. For Gieseker stability the inequalities between slopes should be replaced with inequalities between Hilbert polynomials.

== Kobayashi–Hitchin correspondence ==
Narasimhan–Seshadri theorem says that stable bundles on a projective nonsingular curve are the same as those that have projectively flat unitary irreducible connections. For bundles of degree 0 projectively flat connections are flat and thus stable bundles of degree 0 correspond to irreducible unitary representations of the fundamental group.

Kobayashi and Hitchin conjectured an analogue of this in higher dimensions. It was proved for projective nonsingular surfaces by Donaldson (1985), who showed that in this case a vector bundle is stable if and only if it has an irreducible Hermitian–Einstein connection.

== Generalizations ==
It's possible to generalize (μ-)stability to non-smooth projective schemes and more general coherent sheaves using the Hilbert polynomial. Let X be a projective scheme, d a natural number, E a coherent sheaf on X with dim Supp(E) = d. Write the Hilbert polynomial of E as P_{E}(m) = Σ^{d}_{i=0} α_{i}(E)/(i!) m^{i}. Define the reduced Hilbert polynomial p_{E} := P_{E}/α_{d}(E).

A coherent sheaf E is semistable if the following two conditions hold:

- E is pure of dimension d, i.e. all associated primes of E have dimension d;
- for any proper nonzero subsheaf F ⊆ E the reduced Hilbert polynomials satisfy p_{F}(m) ≤ p_{E}(m) for large m.

A sheaf is called stable if the strict inequality p_{F}(m) < p_{E}(m) holds for large m.

Let Coh_{d}(X) be the full subcategory of coherent sheaves on X with support of dimension ≤ d. The slope of an object F in Coh_{d} may be defined using the coefficients of the Hilbert polynomial as $\hat{\mu}_d(F) = \alpha_{d-1}(F)/\alpha_d(F)$ if α_{d}(F) ≠ 0 and 0 otherwise. The dependence of $\hat{\mu}_d$ on d is usually omitted from the notation.

A coherent sheaf E with $\operatorname{dim}\,\operatorname{Supp}(E) = d$ is called μ-semistable if the following two conditions hold:

- the torsion of E is in dimension ≤ d-2;
- for any nonzero subobject F ⊆ E in the quotient category Coh_{d}(X)/Coh_{d-1}(X) we have $\hat{\mu}(F) \leq \hat{\mu}(E)$.

E is μ-stable if the strict inequality holds for all proper nonzero subobjects of E.

Note that Coh_{d} is a Serre subcategory for any d, so the quotient category exists. A subobject in the quotient category in general doesn't come from a subsheaf, but for torsion-free sheaves the original definition and the general one for d = n are equivalent.

There are also other directions for generalizations, for example Bridgeland's stability conditions.

One may define stable principal bundles in analogy with stable vector bundles.

== See also ==
- Kobayashi–Hitchin correspondence
- Corlette–Simpson correspondence
- Quot scheme

== Literature ==
- Atiyah, Michael Francis; Bott, Raoul (1983), "The Yang-Mills equations over Riemann surfaces", Philosophical Transactions of the Royal Society of London. Series A. Mathematical and Physical Sciences, 308 (1505): 523–615, Bibcode:1983RSPTA.308..523A, doi:10.1098/rsta.1983.0017, ISSN 0080-4614, JSTOR 37156, MR 0702806
- Donaldson, S. K. (1985), "Anti self-dual Yang-Mills connections over complex algebraic surfaces and stable vector bundles", Proceedings of the London Mathematical Society, Third Series, 50 (1): 1–26, doi:10.1112/plms/s3-50.1.1, ISSN 0024-6115, MR 0765366
- Friedman, Robert (1998), Algebraic surfaces and holomorphic vector bundles, Universitext, Berlin, New York: Springer-Verlag, ISBN 978-0-387-98361-5, MR 1600388
- Harder, G.; Narasimhan, M. S. (1975), "On the cohomology groups of moduli spaces of vector bundles on curves", Mathematische Annalen, 212 (3): 215–248, doi:10.1007/BF01357141, ISSN 0025-5831, MR 0364254
- Huybrechts, Daniel (2004-11-18). Complex geometry: An introduction. Universitext. Springer Science+Business Media. ISBN 978-3540212904.
- Huybrechts, Daniel; Lehn, Manfred (2010), The Geometry of Moduli Spaces of Sheaves, Cambridge Mathematical Library (2nd ed.), Cambridge University Press, ISBN 978-0521134200
- Mumford, David (1963), "Projective invariants of projective structures and applications", Proc. Internat. Congr. Mathematicians (Stockholm, 1962), Djursholm: Inst. Mittag-Leffler, pp. 526–530, MR 0175899
- Mumford, David; Fogarty, J.; Kirwan, F. (1994), Geometric invariant theory, Ergebnisse der Mathematik und ihrer Grenzgebiete (2) [Results in Mathematics and Related Areas (2)], vol. 34 (3rd ed.), Berlin, New York: Springer-Verlag, ISBN 978-3-540-56963-3, MR 1304906 especially appendix 5C.
- Narasimhan, M. S.; Seshadri, C. S. (1965), "Stable and unitary vector bundles on a compact Riemann surface", Annals of Mathematics, Second Series, 82 (3), The Annals of Mathematics, Vol. 82, No. 3: 540–567, doi:10.2307/1970710, ISSN 0003-486X, JSTOR 1970710, MR 0184252
