= S-equivalence =

S-equivalence is an equivalence relation on the families of semistable vector bundles on an algebraic curve.

== Definition ==
Let X be a projective curve over an algebraically closed field k. A vector bundle on X can be considered as a locally free sheaf. Every semistable locally free E on X admits a Jordan-Hölder filtration with stable subquotients, i.e.

$$0 = E_0 \subseteq E_1 \subseteq \ldots \subseteq E_n = E$$

where $E_i$ are locally free sheaves on X and $E_i/E_{i-1}$ are stable. Although the Jordan-Hölder filtration is not unique, the subquotients are, which means that $gr E = \bigoplus_i E_i/E_{i-1}$ is unique up to isomorphism.

Two semistable locally free sheaves E and F on X are S-equivalent if gr E ≅ gr F.
