= Soheyla Feyzbakhsh =

Iranian-British mathematician

- Education: University of Edinburgh
- Awards: Whitehead Prize (2023); Adams Prize (2024); Veblen Prize (2025); Leverhulme Prize (2026)
- Scientific career
- Fields: Algebraic geometry Mathematical physics
- Workplaces: Imperial College London
- Thesis: Bridgeland stability conditions, stability of the restricted bundle, Brill-Noether theory and Mukai's program
- Doctoral advisor: Arend Bayer
- Website: sites.google.com/view/soheylafeyzbakhsh

Soheyla Feyzbakhsh (Persian: سهیلا فیض‌بخش) is a mathematician whose research connects algebraic geometry to string theory in mathematical physics. Originally from Iran, she works in the UK as Royal Society university research fellow and senior lecturer in mathematics at Imperial College London. She shared the American Mathematical Society's 2025 Oswald Veblen Prize in Geometry with her collaborator Richard Thomas.

== Research contributions ==
Feyzbakhsh research follows a conjecture of Japanese mathematician Shigeru Mukai, according to which any K3 surface can be uniquely determined by a single curve within it. By bringing in notions from string theory, involving the stability of curves with respect to perturbations, she was able to "complete and generalize Mukai's program", and by relating the invariants of the surface to the invariants of the curve within it, she showed how to control the higher-rank Donaldson–Thomas invariants of a surface by the Gromov–Witten invariants of the curve, and to control those in turn by the rank-zero Donaldson–Thomas invariants.

== Education and career ==
Feyzbakhsh studied mathematics and electrical engineering as an undergraduate at Ferdowsi University of Mashhad in Iran, earning a double baccalaureate in 2013. After continuing her studies in a diploma program at the International Centre for Theoretical Physics in Trieste, Italy, she went to the University of Edinburgh in Scotland for doctoral study in pure mathematics. She completed her Ph.D. in 2018 with the dissertation Bridgeland stability conditions, stability of the restricted bundle, Brill-Noether theory and Mukai's program supervised by Arend Bayer.

After postdoctoral research as a Chapman Fellow and EPSRC Postdoctoral Fellow at Imperial College London from 2018 to 2023, and as a Marie-Curie Fellow at Paris-Saclay University from 2021 to 2022, she became a senior lecturer and Royal Society university research fellow at Imperial College in 2024.

== Recognition ==
Feyzbakhsh was a 2023 recipient of the Whitehead Prize of the London Mathematical Society, "for her spectacular applications of wall-crossing techniques to questions in classical and enumerative algebraic geometry". She was a 2024 recipient of the Adams Prize of the University of Cambridge, and of the Boris Dubrovin medal of the International School for Advanced Studies in Trieste, "for her impressive results in algebraic geometry, with relevant implications for mathematical physics, in particular string theory". For 2025 she was awarded the Oswald Veblen Prize in Geometry, shared with Richard Thomas. In 2026, she was awarded the Philip Leverhulme Prize.

== Selected publications ==
- "Mukai's program (reconstructing a K3 surface from a curve) via wall-crossing", Journal für die reine und angewandte Mathematik (2019) announced in 2017

Veblen Prize papers:

- Jointly with Richard Thomas: "Curve counting and S-duality", Épijournal de Géométrie Algébrique (2023) announced in 2020
- Jointly with Richard Thomas: "Rank r DT theory from rank 0", Duke Mathematical Journal (2024) announced in 2021
- Jointly with Richard Thomas: "Rank r DT theory from rank 1", Journal of the American Mathematical Society (2022) announced in 2021
