= Narasimhan–Seshadri theorem =

Mathematic theorem about Riemann surfaces

In mathematics, the Narasimhan–Seshadri theorem, proved by Narasimhan and Seshadri (1965), says that a holomorphic vector bundle over a compact Riemann surface is stable if and only if it comes from an irreducible projective unitary representation of the fundamental group.

The main case to understand is that of topologically trivial bundles, i.e. those of degree zero (and the other cases are a minor technical extension of this case). This case of the Narasimhan–Seshadri theorem says that a degree zero holomorphic vector bundle over a Riemann surface is stable if and only if it comes from an irreducible unitary representation of the fundamental group of the Riemann surface.

Donaldson (1983) gave another proof using differential geometry, and showed that the stable vector bundles have an essentially unique unitary connection of constant (scalar) curvature. In the degree zero case, Donaldson's version of the theorem says that a degree zero holomorphic vector bundle over a Riemann surface is stable if and only if it admits a flat unitary connection compatible with its holomorphic structure. Then the fundamental group representation appearing in the original statement is just the monodromy representation of this flat unitary connection.

== See also ==
- Nonabelian Hodge correspondence
- Kobayashi–Hitchin correspondence
- Stable vector bundle
