= Hermitian Yang–Mills connection =

In mathematics, and in particular gauge theory and complex geometry, a Hermitian Yang–Mills connection (or Hermite–Einstein connection) is a Chern connection associated to an inner product on a holomorphic vector bundle over a Kähler manifold that satisfies an analogue of Einstein's equations: namely, the contraction of the curvature 2-form of the connection with the Kähler form is required to be a constant times the identity transformation. Hermitian Yang–Mills connections are special examples of Yang–Mills connections, and are often called instantons.

The Kobayashi–Hitchin correspondence proved by Donaldson, Uhlenbeck and Yau asserts that a holomorphic vector bundle over a compact Kähler manifold admits a Hermitian Yang–Mills connection if and only if it is slope polystable.

== Hermitian Yang–Mills equations ==
Hermite–Einstein connections arise as solutions of the Hermitian Yang–Mills equations. These are a system of partial differential equations on a vector bundle over a Kähler manifold, which imply the Yang–Mills equations. Let $A$ be a Hermitian connection on a Hermitian vector bundle $E$ over a Kähler manifold $X$ of dimension $n$. Then the Hermitian Yang–Mills equations are:

$$\begin{align}
&F_A^{0,2} = 0 \\
&F_A \cdot \omega = \lambda(E) \operatorname{Id},
\end{align}$$

for some constant $\lambda(E)\in \mathbb{C}$. Here we have:

$$F_A\wedge\omega^{n-1}
=(F_A\cdot\omega)\omega^n
=\lambda(E)\omega^n\operatorname{Id}.$$

Notice that since $A$ is assumed to be a Hermitian connection, the curvature $F_A$ is skew-Hermitian, and so $F_A^{0,2}=0$ implies $F_A^{2,0} = 0$. When the underlying Kähler manifold $X$ is compact, $\lambda(E)$ may be computed using Chern–Weil theory. Namely, we have

$$\begin{align}
\deg(E)
&:= \int_X c_1(E) \wedge \omega^{n-1}\\
&=\frac{i}{2\pi} \int_X \operatorname{Tr}(F_A) \wedge \omega^{n-1}\\
&=\frac{i}{2\pi} \int_X \operatorname{Tr}(F_A \cdot \omega) \omega^n.
\end{align}$$

Since $F_A \cdot \omega = \lambda(E) \operatorname{Id}_E$ and the identity endomorphism has trace given by the rank of $E$, we obtain

$$\lambda(E) = -\frac{2\pi i}{n! \operatorname{Vol}(X)} \mu(E),$$

where $\mu(E)$ is the slope of the vector bundle $E$, given by

$$\mu(E) = \frac{\deg(E)}{\operatorname{rank}(E)},$$

and the volume of $X$ is taken with respect to the volume form $\omega^n/n!$.

Due to the similarity of the second condition in the Hermitian Yang–Mills equations with the equations for an Einstein metric, solutions of the Hermitian Yang–Mills equations are often called Hermite–Einstein connections, as well as Hermitian Yang–Mills connections.

== Examples ==
The Levi-Civita connection of a Kähler–Einstein metric is Hermite–Einstein with respect to the Kähler–Einstein metric. (These examples are however dangerously misleading, because there are compact Einstein manifolds, such as the Page metric on ${\mathbb C P}^2 \# \overline{\mathbb C P^2}$, that are Hermitian, but for which the Levi-Civita connection is not Hermite–Einstein.)

When the Hermitian vector bundle $E$ has a holomorphic structure, there is a natural choice of Hermitian connection, the Chern connection. For the Chern connection, the condition that $F_A^{0,2}=0$ is automatically satisfied. The Hitchin–Kobayashi correspondence asserts that a holomorphic vector bundle $E$ admits a Hermitian metric $h$ such that the associated Chern connection satisfies the Hermitian Yang–Mills equations if and only if the vector bundle is polystable. From this perspective, the Hermitian Yang–Mills equations can be seen as a system of equations for the metric $h$ rather than the associated Chern connection, and such metrics solving the equations are called Hermite–Einstein metrics.

The Hermite–Einstein condition on Chern connections was first introduced by Kobayashi (1980, section 6). These equation imply the Yang–Mills equations in any dimension, and in real dimension four are closely related to the self-dual Yang–Mills equations that define instantons. In particular, when the complex dimension of the Kähler manifold $X$ is $2$, there is a splitting of the forms into self-dual and anti-self-dual forms. The complex structure interacts with this as follows:

$$\Lambda_+^2 = \Lambda^{2,0} \oplus \Lambda^{0,2} \oplus \langle \omega \rangle,\qquad \Lambda_-^2 = \langle \omega \rangle^{\perp} \subset \Lambda^{1,1}$$

When the degree of the vector bundle $E$ vanishes, then the Hermitian Yang–Mills equations become $F_A^{0,2} = F_A^{2,0} = F_A \cdot \omega=0$. By the above representation, this is precisely the condition that $F_A^+ = 0$. That is, $A$ is an ASD instanton. Notice that when the degree does not vanish, solutions of the Hermitian Yang–Mills equations cannot be anti-self-dual, and in fact there are no solutions to the ASD equations in this case.

== See also ==
- Einstein manifold
- Deformed Hermitian Yang–Mills equation
- Gauge theory (mathematics)

== Literature ==
- Kobayashi, Shoshichi (1980), "First Chern class and holomorphic tensor fields", Nagoya Mathematical Journal, 77: 5–11, doi:10.1017/S0027763000018602, ISSN 0027-7630, MR 0556302, S2CID 118228189
- Kobayashi, Shoshichi (1987), Differential geometry of complex vector bundles, Publications of the Mathematical Society of Japan, vol. 15, Princeton University Press, ISBN 978-0-691-08467-1, MR 0909698
- Huybrechts, Daniel (2004-11-18). Complex geometry: An introduction. Universitext. Springer Science+Business Media. ISBN 978-3540212904.
