= Tom Bridgeland =

English mathematics professor (born 1973)

Tom Bridgeland FRS
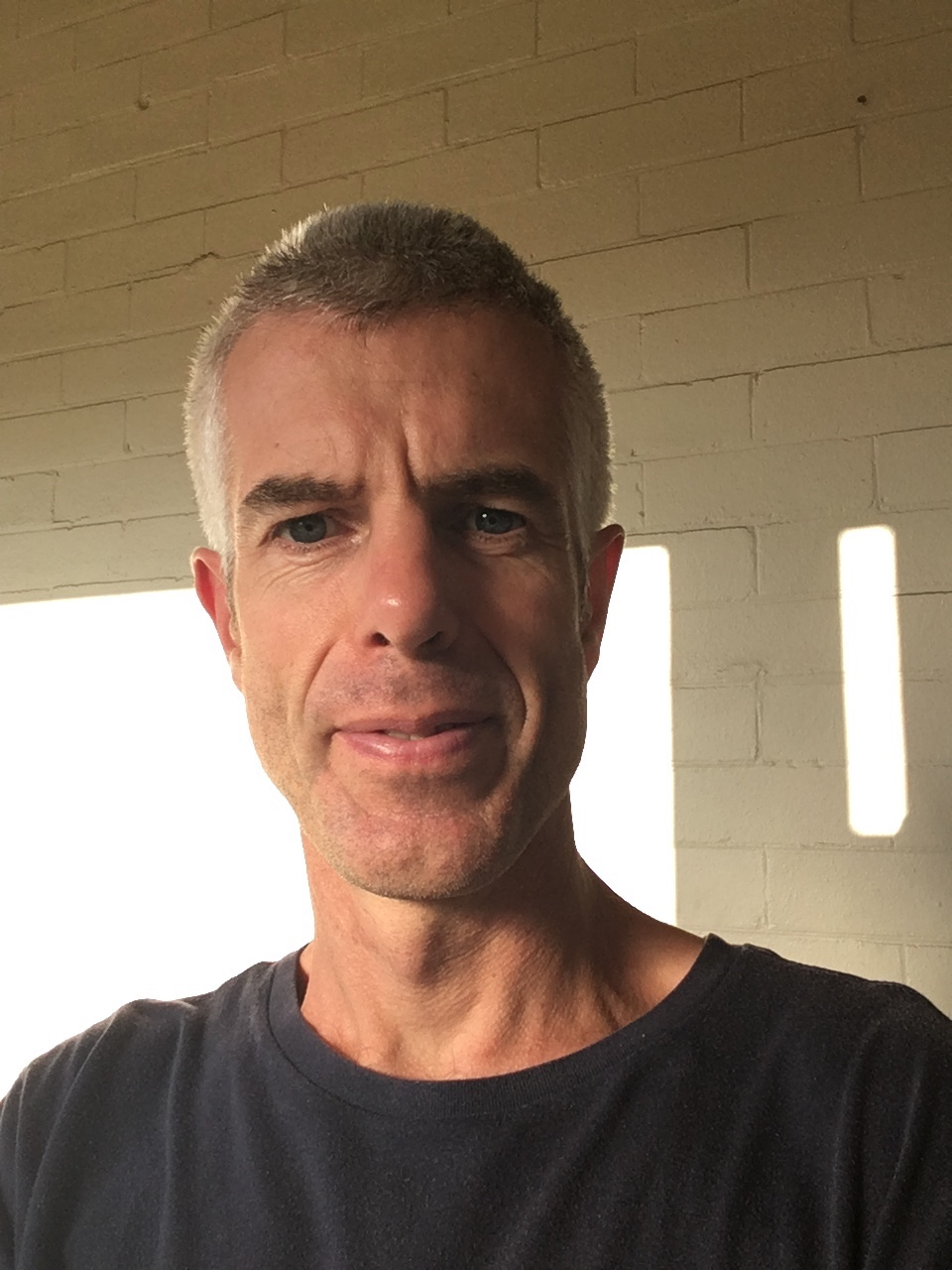
- Born: Thomas Andrew Bridgeland; 1973 (age 52–53)
- Education: Shelley High School; Christ's College, Cambridge; University of Edinburgh
- Awards: Adams Prize (2007); Berwick Prize (2003)
- Scientific career
- Workplaces: Christ's College, Cambridge; University of Edinburgh; University of Sheffield; All Souls College, Oxford
- Thesis: Fourier-Mukai transforms for surfaces and moduli spaces of stable sheaves (2002)
- Doctoral advisor: Antony Maciocia
- Website: tom-bridgeland.staff.shef.ac.uk

Thomas Andrew Bridgeland FRS (born 1973) is a Professor of Mathematics at the University of Sheffield. He was a senior research fellow in 2011–2013 at All Souls College, Oxford and, since 2013, remains as a Quondam Fellow. He is most well-known for defining Bridgeland stability conditions on triangulated categories.

== Education ==
Bridgeland was educated at Shelley High School in Huddersfield and Christ's College, Cambridge, where he studied the Mathematical Tripos in the University of Cambridge, graduating with a first class degree in mathematics in 1994 and a distinction in Part III the following year. He completed his PhD at the University of Edinburgh, where he also stayed for a postdoctoral research position.

== Research and career ==
Bridgeland's research interest is in algebraic geometry, focusing on properties of derived categories of coherent sheaves on algebraic varieties. His most-cited papers are on stability conditions, on triangulated categories and K3 surfaces; in the first he defines the idea of a stability condition on a triangulated category, and demonstrates that the set of all stability conditions on a fixed category form a manifold, whilst in the second he describes one connected component of the space of stability conditions on the bounded derived category of coherent sheaves on a complex algebraic K3 surface.

Bridgeland's work helped to establish the coherent derived category as a key invariant of algebraic varieties and stimulated world-wide enthusiasm for what had previously been a technical backwater. His results on Fourier–Mukai transforms solve many problems within algebraic geometry, and have been influential in homological and commutative algebra, the theory of moduli spaces, representation theory and combinatorics. Bridgeland's 2002 Annals paper introduced spaces of stability conditions on triangulated categories, replacing the traditional rational slope of moduli problems by a complex phase. This far-reaching innovation gives a rigorous mathematical language for describing D-branes and creates a new area of deep interaction between theoretical physics and algebraic geometry. It has been a central component of subsequent work on homological mirror symmetry.

Bridgeland's research has been funded by the Engineering and Physical Sciences Research Council (EPSRC).

=== Awards and honours ===
Bridgeland won the Berwick Prize in 2003, the Adams Prize in 2007 and was elected a Fellow of the Royal Society (FRS) in 2014. He was an invited speaker at the International Congress of Mathematicians, Madrid in 2006.
