= Complex algebraic variety =

The Riemann sphere is one of the simplest complex algebraic varieties.

In algebraic geometry, a complex algebraic variety is an algebraic variety (in the scheme sense or otherwise) over the field of complex numbers.

== Chow's theorem ==
Chow's theorem states that a projective complex analytic variety, i.e., a closed analytic subvariety of the complex projective space $\mathbb{C}\mathbf{P}^n$, is an algebraic variety. These are usually simply referred to as projective varieties.

== Hironaka's theorem ==
Let X be a complex algebraic variety. Then there is a projective resolution of singularities $X' \to X$.

== Relation with similar concepts ==
Despite Chow's theorem, not every complex analytic variety is a complex algebraic variety.

== See also ==
- Complete variety
- Complex analytic variety

== Bibliography ==
- Abramovich, Dan (2017). "Resolution of singularities of complex algebraic varieties and their families". Proceedings of the International Congress of Mathematicians (ICM 2018). pp. 523–546. arXiv:1711.09976. doi:10.1142/9789813272880_0066. ISBN 978-981-327-287-3. S2CID 119708681.
- Hironaka, Heisuke (1964). "Resolution of Singularities of an Algebraic Variety over a Field of Characteristic Zero: I". Annals of Mathematics. 79 (1): 109–203. doi:10.2307/1970486. JSTOR 1970486.
