= Bridgeland stability condition =

Stability conditions for triangulated categories

In mathematics, and especially algebraic geometry, a Bridgeland stability condition is an algebro-geometric stability condition defined on elements of a triangulated category. Stability conditions serve a two-fold purpose in the theory - first, the space of all stability conditions on the triangulated category carries the structure of a complex manifold, thus furnishing an invariant of the category that is topological in nature. Second, each stability condition allows the construction of well-behaved moduli spaces parametrising objects in the category that are semistable with respect to it.

The case of original interest and particular importance is when this triangulated category is the derived category of coherent sheaves on a Calabi–Yau manifold, and this situation has fundamental links to string theory and the study of D-branes. Such stability conditions were introduced in a rudimentary form by Michael Douglas called $\Pi$-stability and used to study BPS B-branes in string theory. This concept was made precise by Tom Bridgeland, who defined stability conditions and initiated their study mathematically, and after whom the concept is named.

(Bridgeland) stability conditions remain an active area of research. The moduli spaces they furnish have yielded new constructions of hyperKähler varieties, and the stability manifold (i.e. the complex manifold formed by all stability conditions) has been used to study the autoequivalence groups of many triangulated categories. Wall-crossing, i.e. the analysis of how moduli spaces of semistable objects change as the stability condition varies in the stability manifold, has been employed to solve problems in enumerative geometry and Brill-Noether theory.

== Definition and first examples ==
=== Motivation ===
To construct well-behaved moduli spaces of vector bundles on a smooth algebraic curve, it is necessary to restrict attention to the class of semistable vector bundles—these are bundles $W$ that satisfy the inequality $\mu(W)\geq \mu(V)$ for all sub-bundles $V\subset W$, where $\mu(-)=\operatorname{deg}(-)/\operatorname{rank}(-)$is the slope function. This inequality of slopes can be equivalently stated by saying the complex number $Z(W)=-\operatorname{deg}(W)+i\operatorname{rank}(W)$ has a greater argument than analogously defined $Z(V)$.

The Harder--Narasimhan theorem states that every coherent sheaf on the curve admits a filtration by semistable vector bundles and skyscraper sheaves. It follows that every complex of coherent sheaves in the derived category of the curve admits a filtration by shifts of semistable bundles and skyscraper sheaves.

A Bridgeland stability condition on a triangulated category is an abstraction of the above phenomenon. It picks out a class of semistable objects which provide building blocks for the category, and provides numerical criteria for determining when a given object is semistable.

=== Formal definition ===
A stability condition on a triangulated category $\mathcal{D}$ is a pair $(Z,\mathcal{P})$ where the slicing $\mathcal{P}$ is a collection of full additive subcategories $\mathcal{P}(\varphi)\subset\mathcal{D}$ for each $\varphi\in \mathbb{R}$, and the central charge $Z\colon \mathsf{K}_0(\mathcal{D})\to \mathbb{C}$ is a group homomorphism from the Grothendieck group of $\mathcal{D}$ to the additive group of the complex numbers, satisfying the following condition:

Shift-periodicity
An object $A$ lies in $\mathcal{P}(\varphi)$ if and only if $A[1]\in \mathcal{P}(\varphi+1)$.
Right-orthogonality
If $A\in \mathcal{P}(\varphi_1)$, $B\in \mathcal{P}(\varphi_2)$, and $\varphi_1 > \varphi_2$, then $\operatorname{Hom}(A,B)=0$.
Compatibility of slicing and central charge
For every $\varphi\in\mathbb{R}$ and non-zero object $A\in\mathcal{P}(\varphi)$, there is a positive real number $m(A)$ (called the mass of $A$) such that$Z(A)=m(A)\cdot e^{i\pi\varphi}$.
Existence of Harder—Narasimhan filtrations
For every object $E\in \mathcal{D}$ there exists a finite sequence of real numbers $\varphi_1>\varphi_2>\cdots>\varphi_n$, and objects $A_i\in \mathcal{P}(\varphi_i)$ for each $i$ sitting in the sequence of exact triangles below.

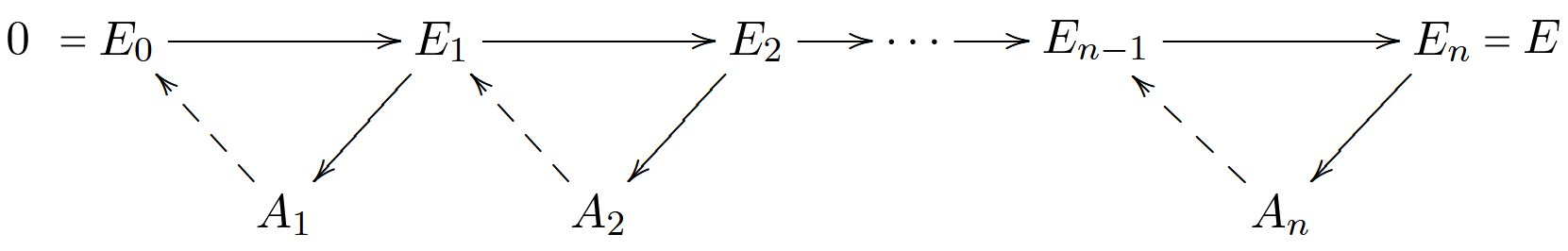

For a stability condition $\sigma=(Z,\mathcal{P})$ and a real number $\varphi\in\mathbb{R}$, a non-zero object $A\in\mathcal{P}(\varphi)$ is said to be $\sigma$-semistable of phase $\varphi$ (or simply semistable). If it additionally has no proper non-zero sub-objects in $\mathcal{P}(\varphi)$, it is said to be stable. Given an interval $I\subset\mathbb{R}$, it is typical to write $\mathcal{P}(I)$ for the smallest extension-closed subcategory of $\mathcal{D}$ containing all $\mathcal{P}(\varphi)$ for $\varphi\in I$.

The four conditions above constitute Bridgeland's original definition of a stability condition. For most applications including the construction of the Bridgeland stability manifold, it is necessary to impose one of the additional constraints below.

Local finiteness
There exists a real number $\varepsilon >0$ such that for all $\varphi\in\mathbb{R}$, the quasi-abelian category$\mathcal{P}(\varphi-\varepsilon, \varphi+\varepsilon)$has finite length.

Support property
The central charge admits a factorisation $Z\colon \mathsf{K}_0(\mathcal{D})\xrightarrow{\;\lambda\;}\Lambda\xrightarrow{\;z\;} \mathbb{C}$ where $\Lambda$ is a free abelian group of finite rank, such that for some (equivalently any) norm $\Vert \cdot \Vert$ on $\Lambda\otimes\mathbb{R}$, there is a real number $C>0$ such that the inequality $|Z(E)|\geq C\cdot \Vert \lambda(E) \Vert$holds for all semi-stable objects $E$. This is equivalent to the existence of a symmetric bilinear form $Q$ on the vector space $\Lambda\otimes\mathbb{R}$ such that $Q(\lambda[E],\lambda[E])\geq 0$ for each semi-stable object $E\in\mathcal{D}$, and $Q(\ell, \ell)\leq 0$ for each $\ell\in \ker(z)\subset \Lambda\otimes \mathbb{R}$.
Bayer and Macrì showed the support property implies local finiteness, but the converse implication is generally false.

The support property was introduced by Kontsevich and Soibelman, as an abstraction of the observation that when the metric on a three-dimensional Calabi-Yau manifold approaches the large volume limit, the integrals of harmonic forms ("norms") on special Lagrangian submanifolds ("stable objects") is uniformly bounded by their volumes ("central charge") .

Many authors include the support property in the definition of a stability condition, calling those without the support property pre-stability conditions instead.

=== Stability conditions on curves ===
For a smooth projective curve $C$, the function $Z(-)=-\operatorname{deg}(-)+i\cdot \operatorname{rank}(-)$ extends to a well-defined central charge $\mathsf{K}_0(\mathsf{D}^bC)\to \mathbb{C}$ on the derived category of coherent sheaves on $C$.

Declaring $\mathcal{P}(1)$ to be the full subcategory of torsion sheaves, $\mathcal{P}(\varphi)$ for $\varphi\in (0,1)$ to be the full additive subcategory generated by semistable vector bundles $W$ with slope $\mu(W)=-\tan(\varphi)$, and extending to remaining $\varphi\in \mathbb{R}$ by shift-periodicity defines a slicing on $\mathsf{D}^b C$ by the Harder—Narasimhan theorem.

The pair $(Z,\mathcal{P})$ is a Bridgeland stability condition that has the support property. More generally, the construction can be repeated with any function $Z_w(-)=-\operatorname{deg}(-)+w\cdot \operatorname{rank}(-)$for a number $w$ in the complex upper half-plane $\mathbb{H}$, each such pair $(Z_w,\mathcal{P}_w)$ is a stability condition on $\mathsf{D}^bC$.

== On abelian categories ==
A stability function on an abelian category $\mathcal{A}$ is a group homomorphism $Z\colon \mathsf{K}_0(\mathcal{A})\to \mathbb{C}$ such that for each non-zero object $E\in \mathcal{A}$, the complex number $Z(E)$ lies in the semi-closed upper half plane $\mathbb{R}_{<0}\cup \mathbb{H}$.

The phase of $E$ is the real number $\varphi(E)=\tfrac{1}{\pi}\operatorname{arg}Z(E)\in (0,1]$. The object $E$ is semi-stable (resp. stable) with respect to $Z$ if for every proper non-zero sub-object $F\subset E$, the inequality $\varphi(F)\leq \varphi(E)$ (resp. $\varphi(F)<\varphi(E)$) holds.

The stability function $Z$ has the Harder—Narasimhan property if every non-zero object $E\in \mathcal{A}$ admits a filtration
$$0=E_0\subset E_1\subset \cdots \subset E_n=E$$
such that each factor $F_i=E_i/E_{i-1}$ is semistable and their phases satisfy $\varphi(F_1)>\varphi(F_2)>\ldots >\varphi(F_n).$

Bridgeland showed that a stability condition $(Z,\mathcal{P})$ on a triangulated category $\mathcal{D}$ is equivalent to the data of the heart of a bounded t-structure $\mathcal{A}\subset\mathcal{D}$, and a stability function $Z\colon \mathsf{K}_0(\mathcal{A})\to \mathbb{C}$ with the Harder—Narasimhan property. There is a natural isomorphism of Grothendieck groups $\mathsf{K}_0(\mathcal{A})\cong \mathsf{K}_0(\mathcal{D})$ that turns the stability function into a central charge, and defining
$$\mathcal{P}(\varphi)=\left\langle E\in \mathcal{A}\;|\; E\text{ semi-stable with }\varphi(E)=\varphi \right\rangle$$
for $\varphi\in (0,1]$ uniquely specifies a slicing on $\mathcal{D}$. Conversely if $(Z,\mathcal{P})$ is a stability condition, then the subcategory $\mathcal{P}(0,1]$is the heart of a bounded t-structure on which $Z$ gives a stability function with Harder—Narasimhan property.

== The stability manifold ==
For an essentially small triangulated category $\mathcal{D}$ with a fixed surjection $\lambda\colon \mathsf{K}_0(\mathcal{D})\to \Lambda$ onto a free abelian group of finite rank, there is a complex manifold $\operatorname{Stab}(\mathcal{D})$ called the stability manifold whose points parametrise stability conditions $(Z,\mathcal{P})$ on $\mathcal{D}$ for which the central charge $Z$ factors through $\lambda$ and has the support property with respect to this factorisation.

Specifically, all stability conditions (with or without the support property) form a metric space. This space is naturally equipped with a continuous map $(Z,P)\mapsto Z$ to the Euclidean space $\operatorname{Hom}_\mathbb{Z}(\mathsf{K}_0\mathcal{D},\mathbb{C})$. When restricted to the subset $\operatorname{Stab}(\mathcal{D})$ of stability conditions that have the support property with respect to $\Lambda$, this map is a local homeomorphism onto the subspace $\operatorname{Hom}_\mathbb{Z}(\Lambda,\mathbb{C})$. This is known as Bridgeland's deformation property, and gives $\operatorname{Stab}(\mathcal{D})$ the structure of a $\operatorname{rank}(\Lambda)$-dimensional complex manifold.

=== Group actions ===
The group of autoequivalences of $\mathcal{D}$ has a left action on the stability manifold $\operatorname{Stab}(\mathcal{D})$, where the equivalence $\Phi\colon \mathcal{D}\to \mathcal{D}$ acts by the isometry $\Phi\cdot (Z,\mathcal{P})=(Z\circ \Phi^{-1}, \Phi\circ \mathcal{P})$. In many situations this action is via deck transformations of the local homeomorphism $\mathcal{Z}\colon \operatorname{Stab}(\mathcal{D})\to \operatorname{Hom}_\mathbb{Z}(\Lambda, \mathbb{C})$, thus providing a topological tool for the analysis of autoequivalences of $\mathcal{D}$.

The neutral component $\mathsf{GL}^+(2,\mathbb{R})$ of the general linear group, containing matrices with positive determinant, has a right action on $\mathbb{C}$ and hence on the space $\operatorname{Hom}_\mathbb{Z}(\Lambda, \mathbb{C})$. This action lifts over the local homeomorphism $\mathcal{Z}$ to a right action of universal cover $\tilde\mathsf{GL}{}^+(2,\mathbb{R})$ on $\operatorname{Stab}(\mathcal{D})$. The additive group $\mathbb{C}$ is a subgroup of $\tilde\mathsf{GL}{}^+(2,\mathbb{R})$, and can be seen as the universal cover of the multiplicative group $\mathbb{C}^\ast\subset \mathsf{GL}(2,\mathbb{R})$. The induced action of $\mathbb{C}$ on $\operatorname{Stab}(\mathcal{D})$, called the rotation action, is explicitly given by $(Z,\mathcal{P})\cdot (x+iy)=(e^{-i\pi (x+iy)} Z, \mathcal{P}(x+\cdot ))$.

=== Geometric stability conditions ===
When $\mathcal{D}$ is the derived category of coherent sheaves on an smooth and proper algebraic variety $X$, the group $\Lambda$ is typically taken to be the numerical Grothendieck group $\mathsf{K}_\text{num}(X)$, defined as the quotient of $\mathsf{K}_0(\mathcal{D})$ by the kernel of the Euler pairing
$$\chi(E,F)=\sum_i (-1)^i \operatorname{dim}\operatorname{Hom}(E,F[i]).$$
A stability condition that has the support property with respect to $\mathsf{K}_\text{num}(X)$ is called numerical.

A geometric stability condition on $\mathcal{D}$ is a numerical stability condition $(Z,\mathcal{P})$ for which all skyscraper sheaves $\mathcal{O}_p$ at closed points $p\in X$are semistable and have the same phase, that is, there is a real number $\varphi$ such that $\{\mathcal{O}_p\;|\; p\in X\}\subset \mathcal{P}(\varphi)$. An example of geometric stability condition is the one defined by slope stability on a smooth curve.

In 2026, Chunyi Li established the existence of geometric stability conditions on smooth projective varieties.

== Examples ==
=== Elliptic curves ===
There is an analysis by Bridgeland for the case of elliptic curves. He finds there is an equivalence

$\text{Stab}(X)/\text{Aut}(X) \cong \text{GL}^+(2,\mathbb{R})/\text{SL}(2,\mathbb{Z})$

where $\text{Stab}(X)$ is the set of stability conditions and $\text{Aut}(X)$ is the set of autoequivalences of the derived category $D^b(X)$.
