= Daniel Huybrechts =

German mathematician (born 1966)

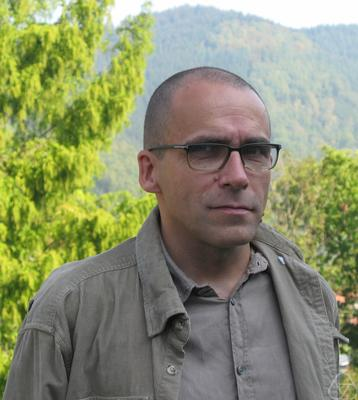
- Huybrechts at Oberwolfach, 2011
- Born: 9 November 1966 (age 59); Berlin, East Germany
- Education: Humboldt University of Berlin
- Scientific career
- Fields: Mathematics
- Workplaces: University of Bonn
- Doctoral advisor: Herbert Kurke

Daniel Huybrechts (9 November 1966) is a German mathematician, specializing in algebraic geometry.

== Education and career ==
Huybrechts studied mathematics from 1985 at the Humboldt University of Berlin, where in 1989 he earned his Diplom with Diplom thesis supervisor Herbert Kurke. In 1990–1992 Huybrechts studied at the Max Planck Institute for Mathematics in Bonn, where he earned his PhD in 1992 under Herbert Kurke with thesis Stabile Vektorbündel auf algebraischen Flächen. Tjurins Methode zum Studium der Geometrie der Modulräume. In the academic year 1994–1995 he was at the Institute for Advanced Study and in 1996 at IHES. In 1996 he was a research assistant at the University of Essen, where in 1998 he earned his Habilitation. In 1997–1998 he was at the École normale supérieure. He was a professor in 1998–2002 at the University of Cologne and in 2002–2005 at the École polytechnique (Chargé de Cours) and, simultaneously, at the University of Paris VII. Since 2005 he has been a professor at the University of Bonn.

Huybrechts does research on K3 surfaces and their higher-dimensional analogues (compact hyperkähler manifolds) and moduli spaces of sheaves on varieties.

In 2010 he was an invited speaker at the International Congress of Mathematicians in Hyderabad and gave a talk Hyperkähler Manifolds and Sheaves.

== Selected publications ==
- Fourier-Mukai transforms in Algebraic Geometry, Oxford Mathematical Monographs, 2006
- Complex geometry – an introduction, Springer, Universitext, 2004
- with Stefan Schröer: Huybrechts, Daniel; Schroeer, Stefan (2003). "The Brauer group of analytic K3 surfaces". International Mathematics Research Notices. 2003 (50): 2687–2698. arXiv:math/0305101. Bibcode:2003math......5101H. doi:10.1155/S1073792803131637. S2CID 17967227.
- with Dominic Joyce, Mark Gross: Calabi-Yau manifolds and related geometries, Springer 2002.
- with Manfred Lehn: The geometry of moduli spaces of sheaves, Vieweg, Aspects of Mathematics, 1997 Huybrechts, Daniel; Lehn, Manfred (2010). 2nd edition. Cambridge University Press. doi:10.1017/CBO9780511711985. ISBN 9780511711985.
- Huybrechts, Daniel (1999). "Compact hyper-Kähler manifolds: basic results". Invent. Math. 135 (1): 63–113. arXiv:math/0106014. Bibcode:1999InMat.135...63H. doi:10.1007/s002220050280. S2CID 189819616.
