= Hermitian connection =

In mathematics, a Hermitian connection $\nabla$ is a connection on a Hermitian vector bundle $E$ over a smooth manifold $M$ which is compatible with the Hermitian metric $\langle \cdot, \cdot \rangle$ on $E$, meaning that

$$v \langle s,t\rangle = \langle \nabla_v s, t \rangle + \langle s, \nabla_v t \rangle$$

for all smooth vector fields $v$ and all smooth sections $s,t$ of $E$.

If $X$ is a complex manifold, and the Hermitian vector bundle $E$ on $X$ is equipped with a holomorphic structure, then there is a unique Hermitian connection whose (0, 1)-part coincides with the Dolbeault operator $\bar{\partial}_E$ on $E$ associated to the holomorphic structure. This is called the Chern connection on $E$. The curvature of the Chern connection is a (1, 1)-form. For details, see Hermitian metrics on a holomorphic vector bundle.

In particular, if the base manifold is Kähler and the vector bundle is its tangent bundle, then the Chern connection coincides with the Levi-Civita connection of the associated Riemannian metric.
