= Kähler identities =

In complex geometry, the Kähler identities are a collection of identities between operators on a Kähler manifold relating the Dolbeault operators and their adjoints, contraction and wedge operators of the Kähler form, and the Laplacians of the Kähler metric. The Kähler identities combine with results of Hodge theory to produce a number of relations on de Rham and Dolbeault cohomology of compact Kähler manifolds, such as the Lefschetz hyperplane theorem, the hard Lefschetz theorem, the Hodge-Riemann bilinear relations, and the Hodge index theorem. They are also, again combined with Hodge theory, important in proving fundamental analytical results on Kähler manifolds, such as the $\partial \bar \partial$-lemma, the Nakano inequalities, and the Kodaira vanishing theorem.

== History ==
The Kähler identities were first proven by W. V. D. Hodge, appearing in his book on harmonic integrals in 1941. The modern notation of $\Lambda$ was introduced by André Weil in the first textbook on Kähler geometry, Introduction à L’Étude des Variétés Kähleriennes.

== The operators ==
A Kähler manifold $(X,\omega,J)$ admits a large number of operators on its algebra of complex differential forms
$$\Omega(X) := \bigoplus_{k \ge 0} \Omega^{k}(X,\mathbb{C}) = \bigoplus_{p,q\ge 0} \Omega^{p,q}(X)$$
built out of the smooth structure (S), complex structure (C), and Riemannian structure (R) of $X$. The construction of these operators is standard in the literature on complex differential geometry. In the following the bold letters in brackets indicates which structures are needed to define the operator.

=== Differential operators ===
The following operators are differential operators and arise out of the smooth and complex structure of $X$:

- $d:\Omega^k(X,\mathbb{C}) \to \Omega^{k+1}(X,\mathbb{C})$, the exterior derivative. (S)
- $\partial:\Omega^{p,q}(X) \to \Omega^{p+1,q}(X)$, the $(1,0)$-Dolbeault operator. (C)
- $\bar \partial:\Omega^{p,q}(X) \to \Omega^{p,q+1}(X)$, the $(0,1)$-Dolbeault operator. (C)

The Dolbeault operators are related directly to the exterior derivative by the formula $d=\partial + \bar \partial$. The characteristic property of the exterior derivative that $d^2 = 0$ then implies $\partial^2 = \bar \partial^2 = 0$ and $\partial \bar \partial = - \bar \partial \partial$.

Some sources make use of the following operator to phrase the Kähler identities.

- $d^c = -\frac{i}{2} (\partial - \bar \partial): \Omega^{p,q}(X) \to \Omega^{p+1,q}(X) \oplus \Omega^{p,q+1}(X)$. (Note: Some sources use the coefficients $-i/4\pi$, $-i/2\pi$, or just $-i$ in the definition of $d^c$ for notational convenience. With the first convention, the Ricci form of a Kähler metric has the local form $\rho = dd^c \log \omega^n$. These conventions change the Kähler identities for $d^c$ by an appropriate constant.) (C)

This operator is useful as the Kähler identities for $\partial, \bar \partial$ can be deduced from the more succinctly phrased identities of $d^c$ by comparing bidegrees. It is also useful for the property that $dd^c = i \partial \bar \partial$. It can be defined in terms of the complex structure operator $J$ by the formula
$$d^c = J^{-1} \circ d \circ J .$$

=== Tensorial operators ===
The following operators are tensorial in nature, that is they are operators which only depend on the value of the complex differential form at a point. In particular they can each be defined as operators between vector spaces of forms $\Lambda^{p,q}_x := \Lambda^p T_{1,0}^* X_x \otimes \Lambda^q T_{0,1}^* X_x$ at each point $x\in X$ individually.

- $\bar \cdot: \Omega^{p,q}(X) \to \Omega^{q,p}(X)$, the complex conjugate operator. (C)
- $L: \Omega^{p,q}(X) \to \Omega^{p+1,q+1}(X)$, the Lefschetz operator defined by $L(\alpha) := \omega \wedge \alpha$ where $\omega$ is the Kähler form. (CR)
- $\star: \Omega^{p,q}(X) \to \Omega^{n-q,n-p}(X)$, the Hodge star operator. (R)

The direct sum decomposition of the complex differential forms into those of bidegree (p,q) manifests a number of projection operators.

- $\Pi_k: \Omega(X) \to \Omega^k(X,\mathbb{C})$, the projection onto the part of degree k. (S)
- $\Pi_{p,q}: \Omega^k(X,\mathbb{C}) \to \Omega^{p,q}(X)$, the projection onto the part of bidegree (p,q). (C)
- $\Pi = \sum_{k=0}^{2n} (k-n) \Pi_k: \Omega(X) \to \Omega(X)$, known as the counting operator. (S)
- $J = \sum_{p,q=0}^n i^{p-q} \Pi_{p,q}$, the complex structure operator on the complex vector space $\Omega(X)$. (C)

Notice the last operator is the extension of the almost complex structure $J$ of the Kähler manifold to higher degree complex differential forms, where one recalls that $J(\alpha) = i\alpha$ for a $(1,0)$-form and $J(\alpha) = -i\alpha$ for a $(0,1)$-form, so $J$ acts with factor $i^{p-q}$ on a $(p,q)$-form.

=== Adjoints ===
The Riemannian metric on $X$, as well as its natural orientation arising from the complex structure can be used to define formal adjoints of the above differential and tensorial operators. These adjoints may be defined either through integration by parts or by explicit formulas using the Hodge star operator $\star$.

To define the adjoints by integration, note that the Riemannian metric on $X$, defines an $L^2$-inner product on $\Omega^{p,q}(X)$ according to the formula
$$\langle \langle \alpha,\beta \rangle \rangle_{L^2} = \int_X \langle \alpha, \beta \rangle \frac{\omega^n}{n!}$$
where $\langle \alpha, \beta\rangle$ is the inner product on the exterior products of the cotangent space of $X$ induced by the Riemannian metric. Using this $L^2$-inner product, formal adjoints of any of the above operators (denoted by $T$) can be defined by the formula
$$\langle \langle T\alpha, \beta\rangle \rangle_{L^2} = \langle \langle \alpha, T^* \beta\rangle \rangle_{L^2}.$$
When the Kähler manifold is non-compact, the $L^2$-inner product makes formal sense provided at least one of $\alpha, \beta$ are compactly supported differential forms.

In particular one obtains the following formal adjoint operators of the above differential and tensorial operators. Included is the explicit formulae for these adjoints in terms of the Hodge star operator $\star$. (Note: Note that the sign $n(k+1)+1$ (see Codifferential) in front of the adjoint $d^*$ becomes $-1$ in all degrees since the dimension $n$ of the complex manifold $X$ is even.)

- $d^*: \Omega^k(X,\mathbb{C}) \to \Omega^{k-1}(X,\mathbb{C})$ explicitly given by $d^* = -\star \circ d \circ \star$. (SR)
- $\partial^*: \Omega^{p,q}(X) \to \Omega^{p-1,q}(X)$ explicitly given by $\partial^* = - \star \circ \bar \partial \circ \star$. (CR)
- $\bar \partial^*: \Omega^{p,q}(X) \to \Omega^{p,q-1}(X)$ explicitly given by $\bar \partial^* = - \star \circ \partial \circ \star$. (CR)
- ${d^c}^*: \Omega^{k}(X,\mathbb{C}) \to \Omega^{k+1}(X,\mathbb{C})$ explicitly given by ${d^c}^* = - \star \circ d^c \circ \star$. (CR)
- $L^* = \Lambda: \Omega^{p,q}(X) \to \Omega^{p-1,q-1}(X)$ explicitly given by $\Lambda = \star^{-1} \circ L \circ \star$. (CR)

The last operator, the adjoint of the Lefschetz operator, is known as the contraction operator with the Kähler form $\omega$, and is commonly denoted by $\Lambda$.

=== Laplacians ===
Built out of the operators and their formal adjoints are a number of Laplace operators corresponding to $d,\partial$ and $\bar \partial$:

- $\Delta_d:= dd^* + d^* d: \Omega^k(X,\mathbb{C}) \to \Omega^k(X,\mathbb{C})$, otherwise known as the Laplace–de Rham operator. (SR)
- $\Delta_\partial:= \partial \partial^* + \partial^* \partial: \Omega^{p,q}(X) \to \Omega^{p,q}(X)$. (CR)
- $\Delta_\bar \partial:= \bar \partial \bar \partial^* + \bar \partial^* \bar \partial: \Omega^{p,q}(X) \to \Omega^{p,q}(X)$. (CR)

Each of the above Laplacians are self-adjoint operators.

=== Real and complex operators ===
Even if the complex structure (C) is necessary to define the operators above, they may nevertheless be applied to real differential forms $\alpha \in \Omega^k(X,\mathbb{R}) \subset \Omega^k(X,\mathbb{C})$. When the resulting form also has real coefficients, the operator is said to be a real operator. This can be further characterised in two ways: If the complex conjugate of the operator is itself, or if the operator commutes with the almost-complex structure $J$ acting on complex differential forms. The composition of two real operators is real.

The complex conjugate of the above operators are as follows:

- $\bar d = d$ and $\overline{d^*} = d^*$.
- $\overline{(\partial)} = \bar \partial$ and $\overline{(\bar \partial)} = \partial$ and similarly for $\partial^*$ and $\bar \partial^*$.
- $\overline{d^c} = d^c$ and $\overline{{d^c}^*} = {d^c}^*$.
- $\bar \star = \star$.
- $\bar J = J$.
- $\bar L = L$ and $\bar \Lambda = \Lambda$.
- $\bar \Delta_d = \Delta_d$.
- $\bar \Delta_\partial = \Delta_\bar \partial$.
- $\bar \Delta_\bar \partial = \Delta_\partial$.

Thus $d,d^*, d^c, {d^c}^*, \star, L, \Lambda, \Delta_d$ are all real operators. Moreover, in Kähler case, $\Delta_\partial$ and $\Delta_\bar \partial$ are real. In particular if any of these operators is denoted by $T$, then the commutator $[T,J]=0$ where $J$ is the complex structure operator above.

== The identities ==
The Kähler identities are a list of commutator relationships between the above operators. Explicitly we denote by $[T,S] = T\circ S - S \circ T$ the operator in $\Omega(X) = \Omega^{\bullet}(X,\mathbb{C})$ obtained through composition of the above operators in various degrees.

The Kähler identities are essentially local identities on the Kähler manifold, and hold even in the non-compact case. Indeed they can be proven in the model case of a Kähler metric on $\mathbb{C}^n$ and transferred to any Kähler manifold using the key property that the Kähler condition $d\omega = 0$ implies that the Kähler metric takes the standard form up to second order. Since the Kähler identities are first order identities in the Kähler metric, the corresponding commutator relations on $\mathbb{C}^n$ imply the Kähler identities locally on any Kähler manifold.

When the Kähler manifold is compact the identities can be combined with Hodge theory to conclude many results about the cohomology of the manifold.

Kähler identities—Let $(X,\omega,J)$ be a Kähler manifold. Then the following identities hold:

- $[\bar \partial, L] = 0$.
- $[\partial, L]=0$.
- $[\bar \partial^*, \Lambda] = 0$.
- $[\partial^*, \Lambda] = 0$.
- $[\bar \partial^*, L] = i \partial$.
- $[\partial^*, L] = - i \bar \partial$.
- $[\Lambda, \bar \partial] = -i\partial^*$.
- $[\Lambda, \partial] = i \bar \partial^*$.
- $\Delta_d = 2 \Delta_{\partial} = 2 \Delta_{\bar \partial}$.
- $\Delta = \Delta_d$ commutes with all of $\star, \partial, \bar \partial, \partial^*, \bar \partial^*, L,$ and $\Lambda$. It also commutes with $\Pi^{p,q}$ and hence $\Delta_d$ preserves bidegree (p,q).

Furthermore the operators $d$ and $d^c$ satisfy the identities:

- $[\Lambda, d] = -2{d^c}^*$.
- $[L, d] = 0$.
- $[\Lambda,d^c] = 0$.
- $[L, d^*] = 2d^c$.

The above Kähler identities can be upgraded in the case where the differential operators $d, \partial, \bar \partial$ are paired with a Chern connection on a holomorphic vector bundle $E \to X$. If $h$ is a Hermitian metric on $E$ and $\bar \partial_E$ is a Dolbeault operator defining the holomorphic structure of $E$, then the unique compatible Chern connection $D_E$ and its $(1,0)$-part $\partial_E$ satisfy $D_E = \partial_E + \bar\partial_E$. Denote the curvature form of the Chern connection by $F$. The formal adjoints may be defined similarly to above using an $L^2$-inner product where the Hermitian metric is combined with the inner product on forms. In this case all the Kähler identities, sometimes called the Nakano identities, hold without change, except for the following:

- $[L, \Delta_{\bar \partial_E}] = - i F \wedge -$.
- $[L, \Delta_{\partial_E}] = i F \wedge -$.
- $\Delta_{\bar \partial_E} + \Delta_{\partial_E} = \Delta_{D_E}$.
- $\Delta_{\bar \partial_E} - \Delta_{\partial_E} = [iF\wedge -, \Lambda]$, known as the Bochner–Kodaira–Nakano identity.

In particular note that when the Chern connection associated to $(h,\bar \partial_E)$ is a flat connection, so that the curvature $F=0$, one still obtains the relationship that $\Delta_{D_E} = 2 \Delta_{\partial_E} = 2 \Delta_{\bar \partial_E}$.

== Primitive cohomology and representation of sl(2,C) ==
In addition to the commutation relations contained in the Kähler identities, some of the above operators satisfy other interesting commutation relations. In particular recall the Lefschetz operator $L$, the contraction operator $\Lambda$, and the counting operator $\Pi$ above. Then one can show the following commutation relations:

- $[\Pi, L] = 2L$.
- $[\Pi, \Lambda] = -2\Lambda$.
- $[L, \Lambda] = \Pi$.

Comparing with the Lie algebra $\mathfrak{sl}(2,\mathbb{C})$, one sees that $\{\Pi, L, \Lambda\}$ form an sl2-triple, and therefore the algebra $\Omega(X)$ of complex differential forms on a Kähler manifold becomes a representation of $\mathfrak{sl}(2,\mathbb{C})$. The Kähler identities imply the operators $\Pi, L, \Lambda$ all commute with $\Delta_d$ and therefore preserve the harmonic forms inside $\Omega(X)$. In particular when the Kähler manifold is compact, by applying the Hodge decomposition the triple of operators $\{\Pi, L, \Lambda\}$ descend to give an sl2-triple on the de Rham cohomology of X.

In the language of representation theory of $\mathfrak{sl}(2,\mathbb{C})$, the operator $L$ is the raising operator and $\Lambda$ is the lowering operator. When $X$ is compact, it is a consequence of Hodge theory that the cohomology groups $H^i(X,\mathbb{C})$ are finite-dimensional. Therefore the cohomology
$$H(X) = \bigoplus_{k=0}^{2n} H^i(X,\mathbb{C}) = \bigoplus_{p,q\ge 0} H^{p,q}(X)$$
admits a direct sum decomposition into irreducible finite-dimensional representations of $\mathfrak{sl}(2,\mathbb{C})$. Any such irreducible representation comes with a primitive element, which is an element $\alpha$ such that $\Lambda \alpha = 0$. The primitive cohomology of $X$ is given by
$$P^k(X,\mathbb{C}) = \{ \alpha \in H^k(X,\mathbb{C}) \mid \Lambda \alpha = 0\}, \quad P^{p,q}(X) = P^k(X,\mathbb{C}) \cap H^{p,q}(X).$$
The primitive cohomology also admits a direct sum splitting
$$P^k(X,\mathbb{C}) = \bigoplus_{p+q=k} P^{p,q}(X).$$

=== Hard Lefschetz decomposition ===
The representation theory of $\mathfrak{sl}(2,\mathbb{C})$ describes completely an irreducible representation in terms of its primitive element. If $\alpha\in P^k(X,\mathbb{C})$ is a non-zero primitive element, then since differential forms vanish above dimension $2n$, the chain $\alpha, L(\alpha), L^2(\alpha), \dots$ eventually terminates after finitely many powers of $L$. This defines a finite-dimensional vector space
$$V(\alpha) = \operatorname{span} \langle\alpha, L(\alpha), L^2(\alpha), \dots \rangle$$
which has an $\mathfrak{sl}(2,\mathbb{C})$-action induced from the triple $\{\Pi, L, \Lambda\}$. This is the irreducible representation corresponding to $\alpha$. Applying this simultaneously to each primitive cohomology group, the splitting of cohomology $H(X)$ into its irreducible representations becomes known as the hard Lefschetz decomposition of the compact Kähler manifold.

Hard Lefschetz decomposition—Let $(X,\omega,J)$ be a compact Kähler manifold. Then the de Rham cohomology of $X$ admits an orthogonal direct sum decomposition
$$H^k(X,\mathbb{C}) = \bigoplus_{i\ge 0} L^i (P^{k-2i}(X,\mathbb{C})).$$
This decomposition is compatible with the Hodge decomposition into Dolbeault cohomology groups:
$$H^{p,q}(X) = \bigoplus_{i\ge 0} L^i(P^{p-i,q-i}(X)).$$
In addition

- If $k>n$, then $P^k(X,\mathbb{C}) = 0$.
- The map $L^{n-k}: P^k(X,\mathbb{C}) \to H^{2n-k}(X,\mathbb{C})$ is injective for $k\le n$, and restricts to give an injection $L^{n-k}: P^{p,q}(X) \to H^{p+n-k,q+n-k}(X,\mathbb{C})$ for each (p,q) such that $p+q=k$.
- The map $L^{n-k}: H^k(X,\mathbb{C}) \to H^{2n-k}(X,\mathbb{C})$ is bijective for $k\le n$, and restricts to give a bijection $L^{n-k}: H^{p,q}(X,\mathbb{C}) \to H^{p+n-k,q+n-k}(X,\mathbb{C})$ for each (p,q) such that $p+q=k$.
- If $k\le n$, then $P^k(X,\mathbb{C}) = \{ \alpha \in H^k(X,\mathbb{C}) \mid L^{n-k+1}\alpha = 0 \}$, and furthermore $P^{p,q}(X) = \{ \alpha \in H^{p,q}(X) \mid L^{n-p-q+1} \alpha = 0\}$.

By the Kähler identities paired with a holomorphic vector bundle, in the case where the holomorphic bundle is flat the Hodge decomposition extends to the twisted de Rham cohomology groups $H_{dR}^k(X,E)$ and the Dolbeault cohomology groups $H^{p,q}(X,E)$. The triple $\{\Pi, L, \Lambda\}$ still acts as an sl2-triple on the bundle-valued cohomology, and the a version of the Hard Lefschetz decomposition holds in this case.

== Nakano inequalities ==
The Nakano inequalities are a pair of inequalities associated to inner products of harmonic differential forms with the curvature of a Chern connection on a holomorphic vector bundle over a compact Kähler manifold. In particular let $(E,h)$ be a Hermitian holomorphic vector bundle over a compact Kähler manifold $(X,\omega)$, and let $F(h)$ denote the curvature of the associated Chern connection. The Nakano inequalities state that if $\alpha \in \Omega^{p,q}(X)$ is harmonic, that is, $\Delta_{\bar \partial} \alpha = 0$, then

- $i\langle \langle F(h) \wedge \Lambda(\alpha), \alpha \rangle \rangle_{L^2} \le 0$, and
- $i\langle \langle \Lambda(F(h)\wedge \alpha), \alpha \rangle \rangle_{L^2} \ge 0$.

These inequalities may be proven by applying the Kähler identities coupled to a holomorphic vector bundle as described above. In case where $E=L$ is an ample line bundle, the Chern curvature $iF(h)$ is itself a Kähler metric on $X$. Applying the Nakano inequalities in this case proves the Kodaira–Nakano vanishing theorem for compact Kähler manifolds.
