= Harmonic differential =

In mathematics, a real differential one-form ω on a surface is called a harmonic differential if ω and its conjugate one-form, written as ω^{∗}, are both closed.

== Explanation ==
Consider the case of real one-forms defined on a two dimensional real manifold. Moreover, consider real one-forms that are the real parts of complex differentials. Let ω = A dx + B dy, and formally define the conjugate one-form to be ω^{∗} = A dy − B dx.

== Motivation ==
There is a clear connection with complex analysis. Let us write a complex number z in terms of its real and imaginary parts, say x and y respectively, i.e. z = x + iy. Since ω + iω^{∗} = (A − iB)(dx + i dy), from the point of view of complex analysis, the quotient (ω + iω^{∗})/dz tends to a limit as dz tends to 0. In other words, the definition of ω^{∗} was chosen for its connection with the concept of a derivative (analyticity). Another connection with the complex unit is that (ω^{∗})^{∗} = −ω (just as i^{2} = −1).

For a given function f, let us write ω = df, i.e. ω = ∂f/∂x dx + ∂f/∂y dy, where ∂ denotes the partial derivative. Then (df)^{∗} = ∂f/∂x dy − ∂f/∂y dx. Now d((df)^{∗}) is not always zero, indeed d((df)^{∗}) = Δf dx dy, where Δf = ∂^{2}f/∂x^{2} + ∂^{2}f/∂y^{2}.

== Cauchy–Riemann equations ==
As we have seen above: we call the one-form ω harmonic if both ω and ω^{∗} are closed. This means that ∂A/∂y = ∂B/∂x (ω is closed) and ∂B/∂y = −∂A/∂x (ω^{∗} is closed). These are called the Cauchy–Riemann equations on A − iB. Usually they are expressed in terms of u(x, y) + iv(x, y) as ∂u/∂x = ∂v/∂y and ∂v/∂x = −∂u/∂y.

== Notable results ==
- A harmonic differential (one-form) is precisely the real part of an (analytic) complex differential. To prove this one shows that u + iv satisfies the Cauchy–Riemann equations exactly when u + iv is locally an analytic function of x + iy. Of course an analytic function w(z) = u + iv is the local derivative of something (namely ∫w(z) dz).
- The harmonic differentials ω are (locally) precisely the differentials df of solutions f to Laplace's equation Δf = 0.
- If ω is a harmonic differential, so is ω^{∗}.

== See also ==
- De Rham cohomology
