= Serre duality =

Theorem in algebraic geometry

In algebraic geometry, a branch of mathematics, Serre duality is a duality for the coherent sheaf cohomology of algebraic varieties, proved by Jean-Pierre Serre. The basic version applies to vector bundles on a smooth projective variety, but Alexander Grothendieck found wide generalizations, for example to singular varieties. On an n-dimensional variety, the theorem says that a cohomology group $H^i$ is the dual space of another one, $H^{n-i}$. Serre duality is the analog for coherent sheaf cohomology of Poincaré duality in topology, with the canonical line bundle replacing the orientation sheaf.

The Serre duality theorem is also true in complex geometry more generally, for compact complex manifolds that are not necessarily projective complex algebraic varieties. In this setting, the Serre duality theorem is an application of Hodge theory for Dolbeault cohomology, and may be seen as a result in the theory of elliptic operators.

These two different interpretations of Serre duality coincide for non-singular projective complex algebraic varieties, by an application of Dolbeault's theorem relating sheaf cohomology to Dolbeault cohomology.

== Serre duality for vector bundles ==
=== Algebraic theorem ===
Let X be a smooth variety of dimension n over a field k. Define the canonical line bundle $K_X$ to be the bundle of n-forms on X, the top exterior power of the cotangent bundle:

$$K_X=\Omega^n_X={\bigwedge}^n(T^*X).$$

Suppose in addition that X is proper (for example, projective) over k. Then Serre duality says: for an algebraic vector bundle E on X and an integer i, there is a natural isomorphism:

$$H^i(X,E)\cong H^{n-i}(X,K_X\otimes E^{\ast})^{\ast}$$

of finite-dimensional k-vector spaces. Here $\otimes$ denotes the tensor product of vector bundles. It follows that the dimensions of the two cohomology groups are equal:

$$h^i(X,E)=h^{n-i}(X,K_X\otimes E^{\ast}).$$

As in Poincaré duality, the isomorphism in Serre duality comes from the cup product in sheaf cohomology. Namely, the composition of the cup product with a natural trace map on $H^n(X,K_X)$ is a perfect pairing:

$$H^i(X,E)\times H^{n-i}(X,K_X\otimes E^{\ast})\to H^n(X,K_X)\to k.$$

The trace map is the analog for coherent sheaf cohomology of integration in de Rham cohomology.

=== Differential-geometric theorem ===
Serre also proved the same duality statement for X a compact complex manifold and E a holomorphic vector bundle. Here, the Serre duality theorem is a consequence of Hodge theory. Namely, on a compact complex manifold $X$ equipped with a Riemannian metric, there is a Hodge star operator:

$$\star: \Omega^p(X) \to \Omega^{2n-p}(X),$$

where $\dim_{\mathbb{C}} X = n$. Additionally, since $X$ is complex, there is a splitting of the complex differential forms into forms of type $(p,q)$. The Hodge star operator (extended complex-linearly to complex-valued differential forms) interacts with this grading as:

$$\star: \Omega^{p,q}(X) \to \Omega^{n-q,n-p}(X).$$

Notice that the holomorphic and anti-holomorphic indices have switched places. There is a conjugation on complex differential forms which interchanges forms of type $(p,q)$ and $(q,p)$, and if one defines the conjugate-linear Hodge star operator by $\bar{\star}\omega = \star \bar{\omega}$ then we have:

$$\bar{\star} : \Omega^{p,q}(X) \to \Omega^{n-p,n-q}(X).$$

Using the conjugate-linear Hodge star, one may define a Hermitian $L^2$-inner product on complex differential forms, by:

$$\langle \alpha, \beta \rangle_{L^2} = \int_X \alpha \wedge \bar{\star}\beta,$$

where now $\alpha \wedge \bar{\star}\beta$ is an $(n,n)$-form, and in particular a complex-valued $2n$-form and can therefore be integrated on $X$ with respect to its canonical orientation. Furthermore, suppose $(E,h)$ is a Hermitian holomorphic vector bundle. Then the Hermitian metric $h$ gives a conjugate-linear isomorphism $E\cong E^*$ between $E$ and its dual vector bundle, say $\tau: E\to E^*$. Defining $\bar{\star}_E (\omega \otimes s) = \bar{\star} \omega \otimes \tau(s)$, one obtains an isomorphism:

$$\bar{\star}_E : \Omega^{p,q}(X,E) \to \Omega^{n-p,n-q}(X,E^*)$$

where $\Omega^{p,q}(X,E)= \Omega^{p,q}(X) \otimes \Gamma(E)$ consists of smooth $E$-valued complex differential forms. Using the pairing between $E$ and $E^*$ given by $\tau$ and $h$, one can therefore define a Hermitian $L^2$-inner product on such $E$-valued forms by:

$$\langle \alpha, \beta \rangle_{L^2} = \int_X \alpha \wedge_h \bar{\star}_E \beta,$$

where here $\wedge_h$ means wedge product of differential forms and using the pairing between $E$ and $E^*$ given by $h$.

The Hodge theorem for Dolbeault cohomology asserts that if we define:

$$\Delta_{\bar{\partial}_E} = \bar{\partial}_E^* \bar{\partial}_E + \bar{\partial}_E \bar{\partial}_E^*$$

where $\bar{\partial}_E$ is the Dolbeault operator of $E$ and $\bar{\partial}_E^*$ is its formal adjoint with respect to the inner product, then:

$$H^{p,q}(X,E) \cong \mathcal{H}^{p,q}_{\Delta_{\bar{\partial}_E}} (X).$$

On the left is Dolbeault cohomology, and on the right is the vector space of harmonic $E$-valued differential forms defined by:

$$\mathcal{H}^{p,q}_{\Delta_{\bar{\partial}_E}} (X) = \{\alpha \in \Omega^{p,q}(X,E) \mid \Delta_{\bar{\partial}_E} (\alpha) = 0\}.$$

Using this description, the Serre duality theorem can be stated as follows: The isomorphism $\bar{\star}_E$ induces a complex linear isomorphism:

$$H^{p,q}(X,E) \cong H^{n-p,n-q}(X,E^*)^*.$$

This can be easily proved using the Hodge theory above. Namely, if $[\alpha]$ is a cohomology class in $H^{p,q}(X,E)$ with unique harmonic representative $\alpha \in \mathcal{H}^{p,q}_{\Delta_{\bar{\partial}_E}} (X)$, then:

$$(\alpha, \bar{\star}_E \alpha) = \langle \alpha, \alpha \rangle_{L^2} \ge 0$$

with equality if and only if $\alpha = 0$. In particular, the complex linear pairing:

$$(\alpha, \beta) = \int_X \alpha \wedge_h \beta$$

between $\mathcal{H}^{p,q}_{\Delta_{\bar{\partial}_E}} (X)$ and $\mathcal{H}^{n-p,n-q}_{\Delta_{\bar{\partial}_{E^*}}} (X)$ is non-degenerate, and induces the isomorphism in the Serre duality theorem.

The statement of Serre duality in the algebraic setting may be recovered by taking $p=0$, and applying Dolbeault's theorem, which states that:

$$H^{p,q}(X,E) \cong H^q(X, \boldsymbol{\Omega}^p \otimes E)$$

where on the left is Dolbeault cohomology and on the right sheaf cohomology, where $\boldsymbol{\Omega}^p$ denotes the sheaf of holomorphic $(p,0)$-forms. In particular, we obtain:

$$H^q(X,E) \cong H^{0,q}(X,E) \cong H^{n,n-q}(X,E^*)^* \cong H^{n-q}(X, K_X \otimes E^*)^*$$

where we have used that the sheaf of holomorphic $(n,0)$-forms is just the canonical bundle of $X$.

== Algebraic curves ==
A fundamental application of Serre duality is to algebraic curves. (Over the complex numbers, it is equivalent to consider compact Riemann surfaces.) For a line bundle L on a smooth projective curve X over a field k, the only possibly nonzero cohomology groups are $H^0(X,L)$ and $H^1(X,L)$. Serre duality describes the $H^1$ group in terms of an $H^0$ group (for a different line bundle). That is more concrete, since $H^0$ of a line bundle is simply its space of sections.

Serre duality is especially relevant to the Riemann–Roch theorem for curves. For a line bundle L of degree d on a curve X of genus g, the Riemann–Roch theorem says that:

$$h^0(X,L)-h^1(X,L)=d-g+1.$$

Using Serre duality, this can be restated in more elementary terms:

$$h^0(X,L)-h^0(X,K_X\otimes L^*)=d-g+1.$$

The latter statement (expressed in terms of divisors) is in fact the original version of the theorem from the 19th century. This is the main tool used to analyze how a given curve can be embedded into projective space and hence to classify algebraic curves.

Example: Every global section of a line bundle of negative degree is zero. Moreover, the degree of the canonical bundle is $2g-2$. Therefore, Riemann–Roch implies that for a line bundle L of degree $d>2g-2$, $h^0(X,L)$ is equal to $d-g+1$. When the genus g is at least 2, it follows by Serre duality that $h^1(X,TX)=h^0(X,K_X^{\otimes 2})=3g-3$. Here $H^1(X,TX)$ is the first-order deformation space of X. This is the basic calculation needed to show that the moduli space of curves of genus g has dimension $3g-3$.

== Serre duality for coherent sheaves ==
Another formulation of Serre duality holds for all coherent sheaves, not just vector bundles. As a first step in generalizing Serre duality, Grothendieck showed that this version works for schemes with mild singularities, Cohen–Macaulay schemes, not just smooth schemes.

Namely, for a Cohen–Macaulay scheme X of pure dimension n over a field k, Grothendieck defined a coherent sheaf $\omega_X$ on X called the dualizing sheaf. (Some authors call this sheaf $K_X$.) Suppose in addition that X is proper over k. For a coherent sheaf E on X and an integer i, Serre duality says that there is a natural isomorphism:

$$\operatorname{Ext}^i_X(E,\omega_X)\cong H^{n-i}(X,E)^*$$

of finite-dimensional k-vector spaces. Here the Ext group is taken in the abelian category of $O_X$-modules. This includes the previous statement, since $\operatorname{Ext}^i_X(E,\omega_X)$ is isomorphic to $H^i(X,E^*\otimes \omega_X)$ when E is a vector bundle.

In order to use this result, one has to determine the dualizing sheaf explicitly, at least in special cases. When X is smooth over k, $\omega_X$ is the canonical line bundle $K_X$ defined above. More generally, if X is a Cohen–Macaulay subscheme of codimension r in a smooth scheme Y over k, then the dualizing sheaf can be described as an Ext sheaf:

$$\omega_X\cong\mathcal{Ext}^r_{O_Y}(O_X,K_Y).$$

When X is a local complete intersection of codimension r in a smooth scheme Y, there is a more elementary description: the normal bundle of X in Y is a vector bundle of rank r, and the dualizing sheaf of X is given by:

$$\omega_X\cong K_Y|_X\otimes {\bigwedge}^r(N_{X/Y}).$$

In this case, X is a Cohen–Macaulay scheme with $\omega_X$ a line bundle, which says that X is Gorenstein.

Example: Let X be a complete intersection in projective space ${\mathbf P}^n$ over a field k, defined by homogeneous polynomials $f_1,\ldots,f_r$ of degrees $d_1,\ldots,d_r$. (To say that this is a complete intersection means that X has dimension $n-r$.) There are line bundles O(d) on ${\mathbf P}^n$ for integers d, with the property that homogeneous polynomials of degree d can be viewed as sections of O(d). Then the dualizing sheaf of X is the line bundle:

$$\omega_X=O(d_1+\cdots+d_r-n-1)|_X,$$

by the adjunction formula. For example, the dualizing sheaf of a plane curve X of degree d is $O(d-3)|_X$.

=== Complex moduli of Calabi–Yau threefolds ===
In particular, we can compute the number of complex deformations, equal to $\dim(H^1(X,TX))$ for a quintic threefold in $\mathbb{P}^4$, a Calabi–Yau variety, using Serre duality. Since the Calabi–Yau property ensures $K_X \cong \mathcal{O}_X$ Serre duality shows us that $H^1(X,TX) \cong H^2(X, \mathcal{O}_X\otimes \Omega_X) \cong H^2(X, \Omega_X)$ showing the number of complex moduli is equal to $h^{2,1}$ in the Hodge diamond. Of course, the last statement depends on the Bogomolev–Tian–Todorov theorem which states every deformation on a Calabi–Yau is unobstructed.

== Grothendieck duality ==
Grothendieck's theory of coherent duality is a broad generalization of Serre duality, using the language of derived categories. For any scheme X of finite type over a field k, there is an object $\omega_X^{\bullet}$ of the bounded derived category of coherent sheaves on X, $D^b_{\operatorname{coh}}(X)$, called the dualizing complex of X over k. Formally, $\omega_X^{\bullet}$ is the exceptional inverse image $f^!O_Y$, where f is the given morphism $X\to Y=\operatorname{Spec}(k)$. When X is Cohen–Macaulay of pure dimension n, $\omega_X^{\bullet}$ is $\omega_X[n]$; that is, it is the dualizing sheaf discussed above, viewed as a complex in (cohomological) degree −n. In particular, when X is smooth over k, $\omega_X^{\bullet}$ is the canonical line bundle placed in degree −n.

Using the dualizing complex, Serre duality generalizes to any proper scheme X over k. Namely, there is a natural isomorphism of finite-dimensional k-vector spaces:

$$\operatorname{Hom}_X(E,\omega_X^{\bullet})\cong \operatorname{Hom}_X(O_X,E)^*$$

for any object E in $D^b_{\operatorname{coh}}(X)$.

More generally, for a proper scheme X over k, an object E in $D^b_{\operatorname{coh}}(X)$, and F a perfect complex in $D_{\operatorname{perf}}(X)$, one has the elegant statement:

$$\operatorname{Hom}_X(E,F\otimes \omega_X^{\bullet})\cong\operatorname{Hom}_X(F,E)^*.$$

Here the tensor product means the derived tensor product, as is natural in derived categories. (To compare with previous formulations, note that $\operatorname{Ext}^i_X(E,\omega_X)$ can be viewed as $\operatorname{Hom}_X(E,\omega_X[i])$.) When X is also smooth over k, every object in $D^b_{\operatorname{coh}}(X)$ is a perfect complex, and so this duality applies to all E and F in $D^b_{\operatorname{coh}}(X)$. The statement above is then summarized by saying that $F\mapsto F\otimes \omega_X^{\bullet}$ is a Serre functor on $D^b_{\operatorname{coh}}(X)$ for X smooth and proper over k.

Serre duality holds more generally for proper algebraic spaces over a field.
