= Fujiki =

Fujiki (written: 藤木 lit. "Japanese wisteria tree") is a Japanese surname. Notable people with the surname include:

- Mayuko Fujiki (藤木 麻祐子, born 1975), Japanese synchronized swimmer and coach
- Naohito Fujiki (藤木 直人, born 1972), Japanese actor and singer
- Ryoji Fujiki (藤木 良司, born 1951), Japanese cross-country skier
- Saburo Fujiki (藤木 三郎, born 1955), Japanese golfer
- Yoshikatsu Fujiki (藤木 義勝, born 1964), Japanese actor and voice actor
- Yū Fujiki (藤木 悠, 1931–2005), Japanese actor

== See also ==
- Fujiki class C, a complex manifold
