= Ddbar lemma =

Theorem in complex geometry

In complex geometry, the $\partial \bar \partial$ lemma (pronounced ddbar lemma) is a mathematical lemma about the de Rham cohomology class of a complex differential form. The $\partial \bar \partial$-lemma is a result of Hodge theory and the Kähler identities on a compact Kähler manifold. Sometimes it is also known as the $dd^c$-lemma, due to the use of a related operator $d^c = -\frac{i}{2}(\partial - \bar \partial)$, with the relation between the two operators being $i\partial \bar \partial = dd^c$ and so $\alpha = dd^c \beta$.

== Statement ==
The $\partial \bar \partial$ lemma asserts that if $(X,\omega)$ is a compact Kähler manifold and $\alpha \in \Omega^{p,q}(X)$ is a complex differential form of bidegree (p,q) (with $p,q\ge 1$) whose class $[\alpha] \in H_{dR}^{p+q}(X,\mathbb{C})$ is zero in de Rham cohomology, then there exists a form $\beta\in \Omega^{p-1,q-1}(X)$ of bidegree (p-1,q-1) such that

$$\alpha = i\partial \bar \partial \beta,$$

where $\partial$ and $\bar \partial$ are the Dolbeault operators of the complex manifold $X$.

=== ddbar potential ===
The form $\beta$ is called the $\partial \bar \partial$-potential of $\alpha$. The inclusion of the factor $i$ ensures that $i\partial \bar \partial$ is a real differential operator, that is if $\alpha$ is a differential form with real coefficients, then so is $\beta$.

This lemma should be compared to the notion of an exact differential form in de Rham cohomology. In particular if $\alpha\in \Omega^k(X)$ is a closed differential k-form (on any smooth manifold) whose class is zero in de Rham cohomology, then $\alpha = d\gamma$ for some differential (k-1)-form $\gamma$ called the $d$-potential (or just potential) of $\alpha$, where $d$ is the exterior derivative. Indeed, since the Dolbeault operators sum to give the exterior derivative $d = \partial + \bar \partial$ and $\bar \partial^2 = 0$, the $\partial \bar \partial$-lemma implies that we could have picked $\gamma = \bar \partial \beta$, refining the $d$-potential to the $\partial \bar \partial$-potential in the setting of compact Kähler manifolds.

== Proof ==
The $\partial \bar \partial$-lemma is a consequence of Hodge theory applied to a compact Kähler manifold.

The Hodge theorem for an elliptic complex may be applied to any of the operators $d, \partial, \bar \partial$ and respectively to their Laplace operators $\Delta_d, \Delta_{\partial}, \Delta_{\bar \partial}$. To these operators one can define spaces of harmonic differential forms given by the kernels:

$$\begin{align}
\mathcal{H}_d^k &= \ker \Delta_d : \Omega^k(X) \to \Omega^k(X)\\
\mathcal{H}_{\partial}^{p,q} &= \ker \Delta_{\partial}: \Omega^{p,q}(X) \to \Omega^{p,q}(X)\\
\mathcal{H}_{\bar \partial}^{p,q} &= \ker \Delta_{\bar \partial}: \Omega^{p,q}(X) \to \Omega^{p,q}(X)\\
\end{align}$$

The Hodge decomposition theorem asserts that there are three orthogonal decompositions associated to these spaces of harmonic forms, given by

$$\begin{align}
\Omega^k(X) &= \mathcal{H}_d^k \oplus \operatorname{im} d \oplus \operatorname{im} d^*\\
\Omega^{p,q}(X) &= \mathcal{H}_{\partial}^{p,q} \oplus \operatorname{im} \partial \oplus \operatorname{im} \partial^*\\
\Omega^{p,q}(X) &= \mathcal{H}_{\bar \partial}^{p,q} \oplus \operatorname{im} \bar \partial \oplus \operatorname{im} \bar \partial^*
\end{align}$$

where $d^*, \partial^*, \bar \partial^*$ are the formal adjoints of $d,\partial, \bar\partial$ with respect to the Riemannian metric of the Kähler manifold, respectively. These decompositions hold separately on any compact complex manifold. The importance of the manifold being Kähler is that there is a relationship between the Laplacians of $d,\partial,\bar \partial$ and hence of the orthogonal decompositions above. In particular on a compact Kähler manifold

$$\Delta_d = 2 \Delta_{\partial} = 2 \Delta_{\bar \partial}$$

which implies an orthogonal decomposition

$$\mathcal{H}_d^k = \bigoplus_{p+q=k} \mathcal{H}_{\partial}^{p,q} = \bigoplus_{p+q=k} \mathcal{H}_{\bar \partial}^{p,q}$$

where there are the further relations $\mathcal{H}_{\partial}^{p,q} = \overline{\mathcal{H}_{\bar \partial}^{q,p}}$ relating the spaces of $\partial$ and $\bar \partial$-harmonic forms.

As a result of the above decompositions, one can prove the following lemma.

Lemma ($\partial \bar \partial$-lemma)—Let $\alpha\in \Omega^{p,q}(X)$ be a $d$-closed (p,q)-form on a compact Kähler manifold $X$. Then the following are equivalent:

1. $\alpha$ is $d$-exact.
2. $\alpha$ is $\partial$-exact.
3. $\alpha$ is $\bar \partial$-exact.
4. $\alpha$ is $\partial \bar \partial$-exact. That is there exists $\beta$ such that $\alpha = i \partial \bar \partial \beta$.
5. $\alpha$ is orthogonal to $\mathcal{H}_{\bar \partial}^{p,q}\subset \Omega^{p,q}(X)$.

The proof is as follows. Let $\alpha\in \Omega^{p,q}(X)$ be a closed (p,q)-form on a compact Kähler manifold $(X,\omega)$. It follows quickly that (d) implies (a), (b), and (c). Moreover, the orthogonal decompositions above imply that any of (a), (b), or (c) imply (e). Therefore, the main difficulty is to show that (e) implies (d).

To that end, suppose that $\alpha$ is orthogonal to the subspace $\mathcal{H}_{\bar \partial}^{p,q} \subset \Omega^{p,q}(X)$. Then $\alpha \in \operatorname{im} \bar \partial \oplus \operatorname{im} \bar \partial^*$. Since $\alpha$ is $d$-closed and $d=\partial + \bar \partial$, it is also $\bar \partial$-closed (that is $\bar \partial \alpha = 0$). If $\alpha = \alpha' + \alpha''$ where $\alpha' \in \operatorname{im} \bar \partial$ and $\alpha'' = \bar \partial^* \gamma$ is contained in $\operatorname{im} \bar \partial^*$ then since this sum is from an orthogonal decomposition with respect to the inner product $\langle - , - \rangle$ induced by the Riemannian metric,

$$\langle \alpha'', \alpha''\rangle = \langle \alpha, \alpha'' \rangle = \langle \alpha, \bar \partial^* \gamma \rangle = \langle \bar \partial \alpha, \gamma \rangle = 0$$

or in other words $\|\alpha''\|^2 = 0$ and $\alpha'' = 0$. Thus it is the case that $\alpha=\alpha'\in \operatorname{im} \bar \partial$. This allows us to write $\alpha = \bar \partial \eta$ for some differential form $\eta \in \Omega^{p,q-1}(X)$. Applying the Hodge decomposition for $\partial$ to $\eta$,

$$\eta = \eta_0 + \partial \eta' + \partial^* \eta''$$

where $\eta_0$ is $\Delta_\partial$-harmonic, $\eta'\in \Omega^{p-1,q-1}(X)$ and $\eta'' \in \Omega^{p+1,q-1}(X)$. The equality $\Delta_\bar \partial = \Delta_\partial$ implies that $\eta_0$ is also $\Delta_{\bar \partial}$-harmonic and therefore $\bar \partial \eta_0 = \bar \partial^* \eta_0 = 0$. Thus $\alpha = \bar \partial \partial \eta' + \bar \partial \partial^* \eta''$. However, since $\alpha$ is $d$-closed, it is also $\partial$-closed. Then using a similar trick to above,

$$\langle \bar \partial \partial^* \eta'', \bar \partial \partial^* \eta''\rangle = \langle \alpha, \bar \partial \partial^* \eta'' \rangle = - \langle \alpha, \partial^* \bar \partial \eta'' \rangle = - \langle \partial \alpha, \bar \partial \eta'' \rangle = 0,$$

also applying the Kähler identity that $\bar \partial \partial^* = -\partial^* \bar \partial$. Thus $\alpha = \bar \partial \partial \eta'$ and setting $\beta = i \eta'$ produces the $\partial \bar \partial$-potential.

== Local version ==
A local version of the $\partial \bar \partial$-lemma holds and can be proven without the need to appeal to the Hodge decomposition theorem. It is the analogue of the Poincaré lemma or Dolbeault–Grothendieck lemma for the $\partial \bar \partial$ operator. The local $\partial \bar \partial$-lemma holds over any domain on which the aforementioned lemmas hold.

Lemma (Local $\partial \bar \partial$-lemma)—Let $X$ be a complex manifold and $\alpha\in \Omega^{p,q}(X)$ be a differential form of bidegree (p,q) for $p,q\ge 1$. Then $\alpha$ is $d$-closed if and only if for every point $p\in X$ there exists an open neighbourhood $U\subset X$ containing $p$ and a differential form $\beta\in \Omega^{p-1,q-1}(U)$ such that $\alpha = i \partial \bar \partial \beta$ on $U$.

The proof follows quickly from the aforementioned lemmas. Firstly observe that if $\alpha$ is locally of the form $\alpha = i\partial \bar \partial \beta$ for some $\beta$ then $d\alpha = d(i\partial \bar \partial \beta) = i (\partial + \bar \partial)(\partial \bar \partial \beta) = 0$ because $\partial^2 = 0$, $\bar \partial^2=0$, and $\partial \bar \partial = - \bar \partial \partial$. On the other hand, suppose $\alpha$ is $d$-closed. Then by the Poincaré lemma there exists an open neighbourhood $U$ of any point $p\in X$ and a form $\gamma\in \Omega^{p+q-1}(U)$ such that $\alpha = d \gamma$. Now writing $\gamma = \gamma' + \gamma''$ for $\gamma'\in \Omega^{p-1,q}(X)$ and $\gamma'' \in \Omega^{p,q-1}(X)$ note that $d\alpha = (\partial + \bar \partial) \alpha = 0$ and comparing the bidegrees of the forms in $d\alpha$ implies that $\bar \partial \gamma' = 0$ and $\partial \gamma'' = 0$ and that $\alpha = \partial \gamma' + \bar \partial \gamma''$. After possibly shrinking the size of the open neighbourhood $U$, the Dolbeault–Grothendieck lemma may be applied to $\gamma'$ and $\overline{\gamma''}$ (the latter because $\overline{ \partial \gamma''} = \bar \partial (\overline{\gamma''}) = 0$) to obtain local forms $\eta', \eta''\in \Omega^{p-1,q-1}(X)$ such that $\gamma' = \bar \partial \eta'$ and $\overline{\gamma''} = \bar \partial \eta''$. Noting then that $\gamma'' = \partial \overline{\eta''}$ this completes the proof as $\alpha = \partial \bar \partial \eta' + \bar \partial \partial \overline{\eta''} = i\partial \bar \partial \beta$ where $\beta = -i \eta' + i \overline{\eta''}$.

== Bott–Chern cohomology ==
The Bott–Chern cohomology is a cohomology theory for compact complex manifolds which depends on the operators $\partial$ and $\bar \partial$, and measures the extent to which the $\partial \bar \partial$-lemma fails to hold. In particular when a compact complex manifold is a Kähler manifold, the Bott–Chern cohomology is isomorphic to the Dolbeault cohomology, but in general it contains more information.

The Bott–Chern cohomology groups of a compact complex manifold are defined by

$$H_{BC}^{p,q}(X) = \frac{ \ker (\partial: \Omega^{p,q} \to \Omega^{p+1,q}) \cap \ker (\bar \partial: \Omega^{p,q} \to \Omega^{p,q+1})}{\operatorname{im} (\partial \bar \partial: \Omega^{p-1,q-1} \to \Omega^{p,q})}.$$

Since a differential form which is both $\partial$ and $\bar \partial$-closed is $d$-closed, there is a natural map $H_{BC}^{p,q}(X) \to H_{dR}^{p+q}(X,\mathbb{C})$ from Bott–Chern cohomology groups to de Rham cohomology groups. There are also maps to the $\partial$ and $\bar \partial$ Dolbeault cohomology groups $H_{BC}^{p,q}(X) \to H_{\partial}^{p,q}(X), H_{\bar \partial}^{p,q}(X)$. When the manifold $X$ satisfies the $\partial \bar \partial$-lemma, for example if it is a compact Kähler manifold, then the above maps from Bott–Chern cohomology to Dolbeault cohomology are isomorphisms, and furthermore the map from Bott–Chern cohomology to de Rham cohomology is injective. As a consequence, there is an isomorphism

$$H_{dR}^{k}(X,\mathbb{C}) = \bigoplus_{p+q=k} H_{BC}^{p,q}(X)$$

whenever $X$ satisfies the $\partial \bar \partial$-lemma. In this way, the kernel of the maps above measure the failure of the manifold $X$ to satisfy the lemma, and in particular measure the failure of $X$ to be a Kähler manifold.

== Consequences for bidegree (1,1) ==
The most significant consequence of the $\partial \bar \partial$-lemma occurs when the complex differential form has bidegree (1,1). In this case the lemma states that an exact differential form $\alpha\in \Omega^{1,1}(X)$ has a $\partial \bar \partial$-potential given by a smooth function $f\in C^{\infty}(X,\mathbb{C})$:

$$\alpha = i\partial \bar \partial f.$$

In particular this occurs in the case where $\alpha = \omega$ is a Kähler form restricted to a small open subset $U \subset X$ of a Kähler manifold (this case follows from the local version of the lemma), where the aforementioned Poincaré lemma ensures that it is an exact differential form. This leads to the notion of a Kähler potential, a locally defined function which completely specifies the Kähler form. Another important case is when $\alpha = \omega - \omega'$ is the difference of two Kähler forms which are in the same de Rham cohomology class $[\omega] = [\omega']$. In this case $[\alpha] = [\omega] - [\omega'] = 0$ in de Rham cohomology so the $\partial \bar \partial$-lemma applies. By allowing (differences of) Kähler forms to be completely described using a single function, which is automatically a plurisubharmonic function, the study of compact Kähler manifolds can be undertaken using techniques of pluripotential theory, for which many analytical tools are available. For example, the $\partial \bar \partial$-lemma is used to rephrase the Kähler–Einstein equation in terms of potentials, transforming it into a complex Monge–Ampère equation for the Kähler potential.

== ddbar manifolds ==
Complex manifolds which are not necessarily Kähler but still happen to satisfy the $\partial \bar \partial$-lemma are known as $\partial \bar \partial$-manifolds. For example, compact complex manifolds which are Fujiki class C satisfy the $\partial \bar \partial$-lemma but are not necessarily Kähler.

== See also ==
- Poincaré lemma
- Dolbeault–Grothendieck lemma
