= Poincaré lemma =

Mathematical condition

In mathematics, the Poincaré lemma gives a sufficient condition for a closed differential form to be exact (while an exact form is necessarily closed). Precisely, it states that every closed p-form on an open ball in R^{n} is exact for p with 1 ≤ p ≤ n. The lemma was introduced by Henri Poincaré in 1886.

== Motivation ==
Especially in calculus, the Poincaré lemma also says that every closed 1-form on a simply connected open subset in $\mathbb{R}^n$ is exact.

In simpler terms, it means that if a differential form is closed in a region that can be shrunk to a point, then it can be written as the derivative of another form; i.e. if dα = 0 on a simply connected region, we can always find α = dβ; therefore we have d(dβ) = 0, expressed simply as d^{2} = 0. This concept is used in mathematical physics, particularly in the context of electromagnetism and differential geometry, where it relates to the fact that the boundary of a boundary is always empty, i.e. if you have a surface (a 2-form) and you take its boundary (a 1-form, a curve), then the boundary of that boundary (a 0-form, a point) is an empty set.

In electromagnetism, magnetic fields can be described using a vector potential, and the Poincaré lemma helps in finding such potentials when the magnetic field is "well-behaved" (i.e., when the magnetic field is not due to a monopole), Gauss's law for magnetism states that the total magnetic flux through a closed surface is always zero, which implies that magnetic monopoles, if they exist, are not isolated but must be accompanied by other magnetic charges.

In the language of cohomology, the Poincaré lemma says that the k-th de Rham cohomology group of a contractible open subset of a manifold M (e.g., $M = \mathbb{R}^n$) vanishes for $k \ge 1$. In particular, it implies that the de Rham complex yields a resolution of the constant sheaf $\mathbb{R}_M$ on M. The singular cohomology of a contractible space vanishes in positive degree, but the Poincaré lemma does not follow from this, since the fact that the singular cohomology of a manifold can be computed as the de Rham cohomology of it, that is, the de Rham theorem, relies on the Poincaré lemma. It does, however, mean that it is enough to prove the Poincaré lemma for open balls; the version for contractible manifolds then follows from the topological consideration.

The Poincaré lemma is also a special case of the homotopy invariance of de Rham cohomology; in fact, it is common to establish the lemma by showing the homotopy invariance or at least a version of it.

== Proofs ==
A standard proof of the Poincaré lemma uses the homotopy invariance formula (cf. see the proofs below as well as Integration along fibers#Example). The local form of the homotopy operator is described in Edelen (2005) and the connection of the lemma with the Maurer–Cartan form is explained in Sharpe (1997).

=== Direct proof ===
The Poincaré lemma can be proved by means of integration along fibers. (This approach is a straightforward generalization of constructing a primitive function by means of integration in calculus.)

We shall prove the lemma for an open subset $U \subset \mathbb{R}^n$ that is star-shaped or a cone over $[0, 1]$; i.e., if $x$ is in $U$, then $tx$ is in $U$ for $0 \le t \le 1$. This case in particular covers the open ball case, since an open ball can be assumed to be centered at the origin without loss of generality.

The trick is to consider differential forms on $U \times [0, 1] \subset \mathbb{R}^{n+1}$ (we use $t$ for the coordinate on $[0, 1]$). First define the operator $\pi_*$ (called the fiber integration) for k-forms on $U \times [0, 1]$ by

$$\pi_* \left( \sum_{i_1 < \cdots < i_{k-1}} f_i dt \wedge dx^i + \sum_{j_1 < \cdots < j_k} g_j dx^j \right) = \sum_{i_1 < \cdots < i_{k-1}} \left( \int_0^1 f_i(\cdot, t) \, dt \right) \, dx^i$$

where $dx^i = dx_{i_1} \wedge \cdots \wedge dx_{i_{k-1}}$, $f_i = f_{i_1, \dots, i_{k-1}}$ and similarly for $dx^j$ and $g_j$. Now, for $\alpha = f \, dt \wedge dx^i$, since $d \alpha = - \sum_l \frac{\partial f}{\partial x_l} dt \wedge dx_l \wedge dx^i$, using the differentiation under the integral sign, we have:

$$\pi_*(d \alpha) = \alpha_1 - \alpha_0 - d(\pi_* \alpha)$$

where $\alpha_0, \alpha_1$ denote the restrictions of $\alpha$ to the hyperplanes $t = 0, t = 1$ and they are zero since $dt$ is zero there. If $\alpha = g \, dx^j$, then a similar computation gives

$$\pi_*(d \alpha) = \alpha_1 - \alpha_0 - d(\pi_* \alpha)$$.

Thus, the above formula holds for any $k$-form $\alpha$ on $U \times [0, 1]$. (The formula is a special case of a formula sometimes called the relative Stokes formula.)

Finally, let $h(x, t) = tx$ and then set $J = \pi_* \circ h^*$. Then, with the notation $h_t = h(\cdot, t)$, we get: for any $k$-form $\omega$ on $U$,

$$h_1^* \omega - h_0^* \omega = J d \omega + d J \omega,$$

the formula known as the homotopy formula. The operator $J$ is called the homotopy operator (also called a chain homotopy). Now, if $\omega$ is closed, $J d \omega = 0$. On the other hand, $h_1^* \omega = \omega$ and $h_0^* \omega = 0$, the latter because there is no nonzero higher form at a point. Hence,

$$\omega = d J \omega,$$

which proves the Poincaré lemma.

The same proof in fact shows the Poincaré lemma for any contractible open subset U of a manifold. Indeed, given such a U, we have the homotopy $h_t$ with $h_1 =$ the identity and $h_0(U) =$ a point. Approximating such $h_t$,, we can assume $h_t$ is in fact smooth. The fiber integration $\pi_*$ is also defined for $\pi : U \times [0, 1] \to U$. Hence, the same argument goes through.

=== Proof using Lie derivatives ===
Cartan's formula for Lie derivatives can be used to give a short proof of the Poincaré lemma. The formula states that the Lie derivative along a vector field $\xi$ is given as:

$$L_{\xi} = d \, i(\xi) + i(\xi) d$$

where $i(\xi)$ denotes the interior product; i.e., $i(\xi)\omega = \omega(\xi, \cdot)$.

Let $f_t : U \to U$ be a smooth family of smooth maps for some open subset U of $\mathbb{R}^n$ such that $f_t$ is defined for t in some closed interval I and $f_t$ is a diffeomorphism for t in the interior of I. Let $\xi_t(x)$ denote the tangent vectors to the curve $f_t(x)$; i.e., $\frac{d}{dt}f_t(x) = \xi_t(f_t(x))$. For a fixed t in the interior of I, let $g_s = f_{t + s} \circ f_t^{-1}$. Then $g_0 = \operatorname{id}, \, \frac{d}{ds}g_s|_{s=0}= \xi_t$. Thus, by the definition of a Lie derivative,

$$(L_{\xi_t} \omega)(f_t(x)) = \frac{d}{ds} g_s^* \omega(f_t(x))|_{s = 0} = \frac{d}{ds} f_{t+s}^* \omega(x)|_{s = 0} = \frac{d}{dt} f_t^* \omega(x)$$.

That is,

$$\frac{d}{dt} f_t^* \omega = f_t^* L_{\xi_t} \omega.$$

Assume $I = [0, 1]$. Then, integrating both sides of the above and then using Cartan's formula and the differentiation under the integral sign, we get: for $0 < t_0 < t_1 < 1$,

$$f_{t_1}^* \omega - f_{t_0}^* \omega = d \int_{t_0}^{t_1} f_t^* i(\xi_t) \omega \, dt + \int_{t_0}^{t_1} f_t^* i(\xi_t) d \omega \, dt$$

where the integration means the integration of each coefficient in a differential form. Letting $t_0, t_1 \to 0, 1$, we then have:

$$f_1^* \omega - f_0^* \omega = d J \omega + J d \omega$$

with the notation $J \omega = \int_0^1 f_t^* i(\xi_t) \omega \, dt.$

Now, assume $U$ is an open ball with center $x_0$; then we can take $f_t(x) = t(x - x_0) + x_0$. Then the above formula becomes:

$$\omega = d J \omega + J d \omega$$,

which proves the Poincaré lemma when $\omega$ is closed.

=== Proof in the two-dimensional case ===
In two dimensions the Poincaré lemma can be proved directly for closed 1-forms and 2-forms as follows.

If ω = p dx + q dy is a closed 1-form on (a, b) × (c, d), then p_{y} = q_{x}. If ω = df then p = f_{x} and q = f_{y}. Set

$$g(x,y)=\int_a^x p(t,y)\, dt,$$

so that g_{x} = p. Then h = f − g must satisfy h_{x} = 0 and h_{y} = q − g_{y}. The right hand side here is independent of x since its partial derivative with respect to x is $q_x-p_y=0$. Since $q - \partial g/\partial y$ is independent of x, it is a function of y only. To find this function, we can evaluate it at any arbitrary value of x, specifically at the boundary $x=a$:

$$h(x,y)=\int_c^y q(a,s)\, ds - g(a,y)=\int_c^y q(a,s)\, ds,$$

and hence

$$f(x,y)=\int_a^x p(t,y)\, dt + \int_c^y q(a,s)\, ds.$$

Similarly, if Ω = r dx ∧ dy then Ω = d(a dx + b dy) with b_{x} − a_{y} = r. Thus a solution is given by a = 0 and

$$b(x,y)=\int_a^x r(t,y) \, dt.$$

=== Inductive proof ===
It is also possible to give an inductive proof of Poincaré's lemma which does not use homotopical arguments. Let $X_m:=I^m$, where $I = (-1, 1)$, be an m dimensional open coordinate cube. For each $n \le m$ the projection $\pi_{m,n}:X_m\rightarrow X_n$ which deletes the last m-n coordinates of a point is a fibration and therefore the pullback map $\pi^\ast_{m,n}:\Omega^\bullet(X_n)\rightarrow\Omega^\bullet(X_m)$ is a monomorphism. We may thus consider any differential k-form which is defined on $X_n$ to be also defined on $X_m$ with no additional notation. Conversely, a k-form $\omega\in\Omega^k(X_m)$ descends to a (necessarily unique) k-form on $X_n$ if and only if its expression with respect to the standard coordinates is

$\omega = \sum_{0\le i_1<\dots<i_k\le n}\omega_{i_1...i_k}(x^1,\dots,x^n)dx^{i_1}\wedge\dots\wedge dx^{i_k}$,

or in other words, its coefficients are functions of the variables $x^1,\dots,x^n$ only, and differentials of only the latter variables are involved.

For a differential k-form $\omega\in\Omega^k(X_m)$, let its codegree be the integer m-k. The induction is performed over the codegree of the form. Since we are working over a coordinate domain, partial derivatives and also integrals with respect to the coordinates can be applied to a form itself, by applying them to the coefficients of the form with respect to the canonical coordinates.

First let $\omega\in\Omega^m(X_m)$, i.e. the codegree is 0. It can be written as
$$\omega = dx^m\wedge \omega_0,\quad \omega_0 = f(x^1,\dots,x^m)dx^1\wedge\dots\wedge dx^{m-1}$$
so if we define $\theta\in \Omega^{m-1}(X_m)$ by $\theta = \int_0^{x_m}\omega_0(x^1,\dots,x^{m-1},s)\,ds$, we have
$$d\theta = dx^m\wedge \partial_m\theta =dx^m\wedge\omega_0 = \omega$$
hence, $\theta$ is a primitive of $\omega$.

Let now $\omega\in\Omega^k(X_m)$, where $0<k<m$, i.e. $\omega$ has codegree m-k, and let us suppose that whenever a closed form has codegree less than m-k, the form is exact. The form $\omega$ can be decomposed as
$$\omega = dx^m\wedge\omega_0 + \omega_1$$
where neither $\omega_0$ nor $\omega_1$ contain any factor of $dx^m$. Define $\lambda:=\int_0^{x_m}\omega_0(x^1,\dots,x^{m-1},s)\,ds$, then $d\lambda = dx^m\wedge\omega_0 + \lambda_1$, where $\lambda_1$ does not contain any factor of $dx^m$, hence, defining $\omega^\prime:=\omega-d\lambda=\omega_1 -\lambda_1$, this form is also closed, but does not involve any factor of $dx^m$. Since this form is closed, we have
$$0=d\omega^\prime = dx^m\wedge\partial_m\omega^\prime + \omega^{\prime\prime}$$
where the last term does not contain a factor of $dx^m$. Due to linear independence of the coordinate differentials, this equation implies that
$$\omega^\prime=\sum_{1\le i_1<\dots<i_k\le m-1}\omega_{i_1...i_k}(x^1,\dots,x^{m-1})dx^{i_1}\wedge\dots\wedge dx^{i_k}$$
i.e. the form $\omega^\prime$ is a differential form in the variables $x^1,\dots,x^{m-1}$ only, hence it descends to an element of $\Omega^{k}(X_{m-1})$, and its codegree is thus m-k-1. The induction hypothesis applies, thus $\omega^\prime = d\theta^{\prime}$ for some $\theta^{\prime}\in\Omega^{k-1}(X_{m-1})\subseteq\Omega^{k-1}(X_m)$, therefore
$$\omega = d\theta,\quad \theta = \theta^\prime + \lambda$$
concluding the proof for a coordinate cube. In any manifold, every point has a neighborhood which is diffeomorphic to a coordinate cube, the proof also implies that on a manifold any closed k-form (for $0<k\le m=\dim M$) is locally exact.

== Implication for de Rham cohomology ==
By definition, the k-th de Rham cohomology group $\operatorname{H}_{dR}^k(U)$ of an open subset U of a manifold M is defined as the quotient vector space

$$\operatorname{H}_{dR}^k(U) = \{ \textrm{ closed } \, k\text{-forms} \, \textrm { on } \, U \}/\{ \textrm{ exact } \, k\text{-forms} \, \textrm { on } \, U \}.$$

Hence, the conclusion of the Poincaré lemma is precisely that if $U$ is an open ball, then $\operatorname{H}_{dR}^k(U) = 0$ for $k \ge 1$. Now, differential forms determine a cochain complex called the de Rham complex:

$$\Omega^* : 0 \to \Omega^0 \overset{d^0}\to \Omega^1 \overset{d^1}\to \cdots \to \Omega^n \to 0$$

where n = the dimension of M and $\Omega^k$ denotes the sheaf of differential k-forms; i.e., $\Omega^k(U)$ consists of k-forms on U for each open subset U of M. It then gives rise to the complex (the augmented complex)

$$0 \to \mathbb{R}_M \overset{\epsilon}\to \Omega^0 \overset{d^0}\to \Omega^1 \overset{d^1}\to \cdots \to \Omega^n \to 0$$

where $\mathbb{R}_M$ is the constant sheaf with values in $\mathbb{R}$; i.e., it is the sheaf of locally constant real-valued functions and $\epsilon$ the inclusion.

The kernel of $d^0$ is $\mathbb{R}_M$, since the smooth functions with zero derivatives are locally constant. Also, a sequence of sheaves is exact if and only if it is so locally. The Poincaré lemma thus says the rest of the sequence is exact too (since a manifold is locally diffeomorphic to an open subset of $\mathbb{R}^n$ and then each point has an open ball as a neighborhood). In the language of homological algebra, it means that the de Rham complex determines a resolution of the constant sheaf $\mathbb{R}_M$. This then implies the de Rham theorem; i.e., the de Rham cohomology of a manifold coincides with the singular cohomology of it (in short, because the singular cohomology can be viewed as a sheaf cohomology.)

Once one knows the de Rham theorem, the conclusion of the Poincaré lemma can then be obtained purely topologically. For example, it implies a version of the Poincaré lemma for contractible or simply connected open sets (see §Simply connected case).

== Simply connected case ==
Especially in calculus, the Poincaré lemma is stated for a simply connected open subset $U \subset \mathbb{R}^n$. In that case, the lemma says that each closed 1-form on U is exact. This version can be seen using algebraic topology as follows. The rational Hurewicz theorem (or rather the real analog of that) says that $\operatorname{H}_1(U; \mathbb{R}) = 0$ since U is simply connected. Since $\mathbb{R}$ is a field, the k-th cohomology $\operatorname{H}^k(U; \mathbb{R})$ is the dual vector space of the k-th homology $\operatorname{H}_k(U; \mathbb{R})$. In particular, $\operatorname{H}^1(U; \mathbb{R}) = 0.$ By the de Rham theorem (which follows from the Poincaré lemma for open balls), $\operatorname{H}^1(U; \mathbb{R})$ is the same as the first de Rham cohomology group (see §Implication to de Rham cohomology). Hence, each closed 1-form on U is exact.

== Poincaré lemma with compact support ==
There is a version of Poincaré lemma for compactly supported differential forms:

Lemma—If $\omega$ is a closed $p$-form with compact support on $\mathbb{R}^n$ and if $p < n$, then there is a compactly supported $(p-1)$-form $\psi$ on $\mathbb{R}^n$ such that $d \psi = \omega$.

The usual proof in the non-compact case does not go through since the homotopy h is not proper. Thus, somehow a different argument is needed for the compact case.

== Complex-geometry analog ==
On complex manifolds, the use of the Dolbeault operators $\partial$ and $\bar \partial$ for complex differential forms, which refine the exterior derivative by the formula $d=\partial + \bar \partial$, lead to the notion of $\bar \partial$-closed and $\bar \partial$-exact differential forms. The local exactness result for such closed forms is known as the Dolbeault–Grothendieck lemma (or $\bar \partial$-Poincaré lemma); cf. § On polynomial differential forms. Importantly, the geometry of the domain on which a $\bar \partial$-closed differential form is $\bar \partial$-exact is more restricted than for the Poincaré lemma, since the proof of the Dolbeault–Grothendieck lemma holds on a polydisk (a product of disks in the complex plane, on which the multidimensional Cauchy's integral formula may be applied) and there exist counterexamples to the lemma even on contractible domains. (Note: For counterexamples on contractible domains which have non-vanishing first Dolbeault cohomology see "∂∂ lemma for contractible domains". mathoverflow.net.) The $\bar \partial$-Poincaré lemma holds in more generality for pseudoconvex domains.

Using both the Poincaré lemma and the $\bar \partial$-Poincaré lemma, a refined local $\partial \bar \partial$-Poincaré lemma can be proven, which is valid on domains upon which both the aforementioned lemmas are applicable. This lemma states that $d$-closed complex differential forms are actually locally $\partial \bar \partial$-exact (rather than just $d$ or $\bar \partial$-exact, as implied by the above lemmas).

== Relative Poincaré lemma ==
The relative Poincaré lemma generalizes Poincaré lemma from a point to a submanifold (or some more general locally closed subset). It states: let V be a submanifold of a manifold M and U a tubular neighborhood of V. If $\sigma$ is a closed k-form on U, k ≥ 1, that vanishes on V, then there exists a (k-1)-form $\eta$ on U such that $d \eta = \sigma$ and $\eta$ vanishes on V.

The relative Poincaré lemma can be proved in the same way the original Poincaré lemma is proved. Indeed, since U is a tubular neighborhood, there is a smooth strong deformation retract from U to V; i.e., there is a smooth homotopy $h_t : U \to U$ from the projection $U \to V$ to the identity such that $h_t$ is the identity on V. Then we have the homotopy formula on U:

$$h_1^* - h_0^* = d J + J d$$

where $J$ is the homotopy operator given by either Lie derivatives or integration along fibers. Now, $h_0 (U) \subset V$ and so $h_0^* \sigma = 0$. Since $d \sigma = 0$ and $h_1^* \sigma = \sigma$, we get $\sigma = d J \sigma$; take $\eta = J \sigma$. That $\eta$ vanishes on V follows from the definition of J and the fact $h_t(V) \subset V$. (So the proof actually goes through if U is not a tubular neighborhood but if U deformation-retracts to V with homotopy relative to V.) $\square$

== On polynomial differential forms ==
In characteristic zero, the following Poincaré lemma holds for polynomial differential forms.

Let k be a field of characteristic zero, $R = k[x_1, \dots, x_n]$ the polynomial ring and $\Omega^1$ the vector space with a basis written as $dx_1, \dots, d x_n$. Then let $\Omega^p = \wedge^p \Omega^1$ be the p-th exterior power of $\Omega^1$ over $R$. Then the sequence of vector spaces

$$0 \to k \to \Omega^0 \overset{d}\to \Omega^1 \overset{d}\to \cdots \to 0$$

is exact, where the differential $d$ is defined by the usual way; i.e., the linearity and

$$d (f \, d x_{i_i} \wedge \cdots \wedge d x_{i_p}) = \sum_j \frac{\partial f}{d x_j} dx_j \wedge d x_{i_i} \wedge \cdots \wedge d x_{i_p}.$$

This version of the lemma is seen by a calculus-like argument. First note that $\ker(d : R \to \Omega^1) = k$, clearly. Thus, we only need to check the exactness at $p > 0$. Let $\omega$ be a $p$-form. Then we write

$$\omega = \omega_0 \wedge dx_1 + \omega_1$$

where the $\omega_i$'s do not involve $dx_1$. Define the integration in $x_1$ by the linearity and

$$\int x_1^r \, dx_1 = \frac{x_1^{r+1}}{r+1},$$

which is well-defined by the char zero assumption. Then let

$$\eta = \int \omega_0 \, dx_1$$

where the integration is applied to each coefficient in $\omega_0$. Clearly, the fundamental theorem of calculus holds in our formal setup and thus we get:

$$d \eta = \omega_0 \wedge \, dx_1 + \sigma$$

where $\sigma$ does not involve $dx_1$. Hence, $\omega - d \eta$ does not involve $dx_1$. Replacing $\omega$ by $\omega - d \eta$, we can thus assume $\omega$ does not involve $dx_1$. From the assumption $d \omega = 0$, it easily follows that each coefficient in $\omega$ is independent of $x_1$; i.e., $\omega$ is a polynomial differential form in the variables $x_2, \dots, x_n$. Hence, we are done by induction. $\square$

Remark: With the same proof, the same results hold when $R = k[\![x_1, \dots, x_n]\!]$ is the ring of formal power series or the ring of germs of holomorphic functions. A suitably modified proof also shows the $\bar \partial$-Poincaré lemma; namely, the use of the fundamental theorem of calculus is replaced by Cauchy's integral formula.

== On singular spaces ==
The Poincaré lemma generally fails for singular spaces. For example, if one considers algebraic differential forms on a complex algebraic variety (in the Zariski topology), the lemma is not true for those differential forms. One way to resolve this is to use formal forms and the resulting algebraic de Rham cohomology can compute a singular cohomology.

However, the variants of the lemma still likely hold for some singular spaces (precise formulation and proof depend on the definitions of such spaces and non-smooth differential forms on them). For example, Kontsevich and Soibelman claim the lemma holds for certain variants of different forms (called PA forms) on their piecewise algebraic spaces.

The homotopy invariance fails for intersection cohomology; in particular, the Poincaré lemma fails for such cohomology.
