= Dolbeault cohomology =

Mathematical term

In mathematics, in particular in algebraic geometry and differential geometry, Dolbeault cohomology (named after Pierre Dolbeault) is an analog of de Rham cohomology for complex manifolds. Let M be a complex manifold. Then the Dolbeault cohomology groups $H^{p,q}(M, \Complex)$ depend on a pair of integers p and q and are realized as a subquotient of the space of complex differential forms of degree (p,q).

== Construction of the cohomology groups ==
Let $\Omega^{p,q}$ be the vector bundle of complex differential forms of degree $(p,q)$. In the article on complex forms, the Dolbeault operator is defined as a differential operator on smooth sections

$$\bar{\partial}:\Omega^{p,q}\to\Omega^{p,q+1}.$$

Since $\bar{\partial}^2=0$, this operator has some associated cohomology. Specifically, define the cohomology to be the quotient space

$$H^{p,q}(M,\Complex)=\frac {\ker\,(\bar \partial: \Omega^{p,q} \to \Omega^{p,q+1})}{\mathrm{im}\, (\bar \partial : \Omega^{p,q-1} \to \Omega^{p,q})}.$$

== Dolbeault cohomology of vector bundles ==
If E is a holomorphic vector bundle on a complex manifold X, then one can define likewise a fine resolution of the sheaf $\mathcal O(E)$ of holomorphic sections of E, using the Dolbeault operator of E. This is therefore a resolution of the sheaf cohomology of $\mathcal O(E)$.

In particular associated to the holomorphic structure of $E$ is a Dolbeault operator $\bar \partial_E : \Gamma(E) \to \Omega^{0,1}(E)$ taking sections of $E$ to $(0,1)$-forms with values in $E$. This satisfies the characteristic Leibniz rule with respect to the Dolbeault operator $\bar \partial$ on differential forms, and is therefore sometimes known as a $(0,1)$-connection on $E$, Therefore, in the same way that a connection on a vector bundle can be extended to the exterior covariant derivative, the Dolbeault operator of $E$ can be extended to an operator

$$\bar \partial_E : \Omega^{p,q}(E) \to \Omega^{p,q+1}(E)$$
which acts on a section $\alpha \otimes s \in \Omega^{p,q}(E)$ by

$$\bar \partial_E (\alpha \otimes s) = (\bar \partial \alpha) \otimes s + (-1)^{p+q} \alpha \wedge \bar \partial_E s$$
and is extended linearly to any section in $\Omega^{p,q}(E)$. The Dolbeault operator satisfies the integrability condition $\bar \partial_E ^2 = 0$ and so Dolbeault cohomology with coefficients in $E$ can be defined as above:

$$H^{p,q}(X,(E,\bar \partial_E)) = \frac {\ker\,(\bar \partial_E: \Omega^{p,q}(E) \to \Omega^{p,q+1}(E))}{\mathrm{im}\, (\bar \partial_E : \Omega^{p,q-1}(E) \to \Omega^{p,q}(E))}.$$
The Dolbeault cohomology groups do not depend on the choice of Dolbeault operator $\bar \partial_E$ compatible with the holomorphic structure of $E$, so are typically denoted by $H^{p,q}(X,E)$ dropping the dependence on $\bar \partial_E$.

== Dolbeault–Grothendieck lemma ==
In order to establish the Dolbeault isomorphism we need to prove the Dolbeault–Grothendieck lemma (or $\bar{\partial}$-Poincaré lemma). First we prove a one-dimensional version of the $\bar{\partial}$-Poincaré lemma; we shall use the following generalised form of the Cauchy integral representation for smooth functions:

Proposition: Let $B_{\varepsilon}(0):=\lbrace z\in\Complex \mid | z|<\varepsilon\rbrace$ the open ball centered in $0$ of radius $\varepsilon\in\R _{>0},$ $\overline{B_{\varepsilon}(0)}\subseteq U$ open and $f\in\mathcal{C}^\infty(U)$, then

$$\forall z\in B_{\varepsilon}(0): \quad f(z)=\frac{1}{2\pi i}\int_{\partial B_{\varepsilon}(0)}\frac{f(\xi)}{\xi-z}d\xi+\frac{1}{2\pi i}\iint_{B_{\varepsilon}(0)}\frac{\partial f}{\partial\bar{\xi}}\frac{d\xi\wedge d\bar{\xi}}{\xi-z}.$$

Lemma ($\bar{\partial}$-Poincaré lemma on the complex plane): Let $B_{\varepsilon}(0),U$ be as before and $\alpha=f d\bar{z}\in\mathcal{A}^{0,1}_{\Complex}(U)$ a smooth form, then

$$\mathcal{C}^\infty(U)\ni g(z):=\frac{1}{2\pi i}\int_{B_{\varepsilon}(0)}\frac{f(\xi)}{\xi-z}d\xi\wedge d\bar{\xi}$$

satisfies $\alpha=\bar{\partial}g$ on $B_{\varepsilon}(0).$

Proof. Our claim is that $g$ defined above is a well-defined smooth function and $\alpha = f\, d\bar{z} = \bar{\partial} g$. To show this we choose a point $z\in B_{\varepsilon}(0)$ and an open neighbourhood $z\in V\subseteq B_{\varepsilon}(0)$, then we can find a smooth function $\rho: B_{\varepsilon}(0)\to\R$ whose support is compact and lies in $B_{\varepsilon}(0)$ and $\rho|_V\equiv 1.$ Then we can write

$$f=f_1+f_2:=\rho f+(1-\rho)f$$

and define

$$g_i:=\frac{1}{2\pi i}\int_{B_{\varepsilon}(0)}\frac{f_i(\xi)}{\xi-z}d\xi\wedge d\bar{\xi}.$$

Since $f_2\equiv 0$ in $V$ then $g_2$ is clearly well-defined and smooth; we note that

$$\begin{align}
g_1&=\frac{1}{2\pi i}\int_{B_{\varepsilon}(0)}\frac{f_1(\xi)}{\xi-z}d\xi\wedge d\bar{\xi}\\
&=\frac{1}{2\pi i}\int_{\Complex}\frac{f_1(\xi)}{\xi-z}d\xi\wedge d\bar{\xi}\\
&=\pi^{-1}\int_0^\infty\int_0^{2\pi}f_1(z+re^{i\theta})e^{-i\theta}d\theta dr,
\end{align}$$

which is indeed well-defined and smooth, therefore the same is true for $g$. Now we show that $\bar{\partial}g=\alpha$ on $B_{\varepsilon}(0)$.

$$\frac{\partial g_2}{\partial\bar{z}}=\frac{1}{2\pi i}\int_{B_{\varepsilon}(0)}f_2(\xi)\frac{\partial}{\partial\bar{z}}\Big(\frac{1}{\xi-z}\Big)d\xi\wedge d\bar{\xi}=0$$

since $(\xi-z)^{-1}$ is holomorphic in $B_{\varepsilon}(0)\setminus V$ .

$$\begin{align}
\frac{\partial g_1}{\partial \bar{z}}=&\pi^{-1}\int_{\Complex}\frac{\partial f_1(z+re^{i\theta})}{\partial\bar{z}} e^{-i\theta}d\theta\wedge dr\\
=& \pi^{-1}\int_{\Complex }\Big(\frac{\partial f_1}{\partial\bar{z}}\Big)(z+re^{i\theta}) e^{-i\theta}d\theta\wedge dr\\
=&\frac{1}{2\pi i}\iint_{B_{\varepsilon}(0)}\frac{\partial f_1}{\partial\bar{\xi}}\frac{d\xi\wedge d\bar{\xi}}{\xi-z}
\end{align}$$

applying the generalised Cauchy formula to $f_1$ we find

$$f_1(z)=\frac{1}{2\pi i}\int_{\partial B_{\varepsilon}(0)}\frac{f_1(\xi)}{\xi-z}d\xi+\frac{1}{2\pi i}\iint_{B_{\varepsilon}(0)}\frac{\partial f_1}{\partial\bar{\xi}}\frac{d\xi\wedge d\bar{\xi}}{\xi-z} =\frac{1}{2\pi i}\iint_{B_{\varepsilon}(0)}\frac{\partial f_1}{\partial\bar{\xi}}\frac{d\xi\wedge d\bar{\xi}}{\xi-z}$$

since $f_1|_{\partial B_{\varepsilon}(0)}=0$, but then $f=f_1=\frac{\partial g_1}{\partial\bar{z}}=\frac{\partial g}{\partial\bar{z}}$ on $V$. Since $z$ was arbitrary, the lemma is now proved.

=== Proof of Dolbeault–Grothendieck lemma ===
Now are ready to prove the Dolbeault–Grothendieck lemma; the proof presented here is due to Grothendieck. We denote with $\Delta_{\varepsilon}^n(0)$ the open polydisc centered in $0\in\Complex^n$ with radius $\varepsilon\in\R_{>0}$.

Lemma (Dolbeault–Grothendieck): Let $\alpha\in\mathcal{A}_{\Complex^n}^{p,q}(U)$ where $\overline{\Delta_{\varepsilon}^n(0)} \subseteq U$ open and $q>0$ such that $\bar{\partial}\alpha=0$, then there exists $\beta\in\mathcal{A}_{\Complex^n}^{p,q-1}(U)$ which satisfies: $\alpha=\bar{\partial}\beta$ on $\Delta_{\varepsilon}^n(0).$

Before starting the proof we note that any $(p,q)$-form can be written as

$$\alpha=\sum_{IJ}\alpha_{IJ} dz_I\wedge d\bar{z}_J=\sum_{J}\left(\sum_I\alpha_{IJ} dz_I\right)_J\wedge d\bar{z}_J$$

for multi-indices $I,J,|I|=p,|J|=q$, therefore we can reduce the proof to the case $\alpha\in\mathcal{A}_{\Complex ^n}^{0,q}(U)$.

Proof. Let $k>0$ be the smallest index such that $\alpha\in(d\bar{z}_1,\dots,d\bar{z}_k)$ in the sheaf of $\mathcal{C}^\infty$-modules, we proceed by induction on $k$. For $k=0$ we have $\alpha\equiv0$ since $q>0$; next we suppose that if $\alpha\in(d\bar{z}_1,\dots,d\bar{z}_k)$ then there exists $\beta\in\mathcal{A}_{\Complex^n}^{0,q-1}(U)$ such that $\alpha=\bar{\partial}\beta$ on $\Delta_{\varepsilon}^n(0)$. Then suppose $\omega \in (d\bar{z}_1, \dots, d\bar{z}_{k+1})$ and observe that we can write

$$\omega=d\bar{z}_{k+1}\wedge \psi + \mu, \qquad \psi, \mu\in(d\bar{z}_1,\dots,d\bar{z}_k).$$

Since $\omega$ is $\bar{\partial}$-closed it follows that $\psi, \mu$ are holomorphic in variables $z_{k+2},\dots,z_n$ and smooth in the remaining ones on the polydisc $\Delta_{\varepsilon}^n(0)$. Moreover we can apply the $\bar{\partial}$-Poincaré lemma to the smooth functions $z_{k+1} \mapsto \psi_J(z_1, \dots,z_{k+1}, \dots, z_n)$ on the open ball $B_{\varepsilon_{k+1}}(0)$, hence there exist a family of smooth functions $g_J$ which satisfy

$$\psi_J=\frac{\partial g_J}{\partial\bar{z}_{k+1}}\quad \text{on} \quad B_{\varepsilon_{k+1}}(0).$$

$g_J$ are also holomorphic in $z_{k+2},\dots,z_n$. Define

$$\tilde{\psi}:=\sum_J g_J d\bar{z}_{J}$$

then

$$\begin{align}
\omega-\bar{\partial}\tilde{\psi}&=d\bar{z}_{k+1}\wedge\psi +\mu-\sum_J\frac{\partial g_J}{\partial\bar{z}_{k+1}}d\bar{z}_{k+1}\wedge d\bar{z}_J +\sum_{j=1}^k\sum_J\frac{\partial g_J}{\partial \bar{z}_{j}}d\bar{z}_j\wedge d\bar{z}_{J\setminus\lbrace j\rbrace}\\
&=d\bar{z}_{k+1}\wedge\psi+\mu-d\bar{z}_{k+1}\wedge\psi+\sum_{j=1}^k\sum_J\frac{\partial g_J}{\partial \bar{z}_{j}}d\bar{z}_j\wedge d\bar{z}_{J\setminus\lbrace j\rbrace}\\
&=\mu+\sum_{j=1}^k\sum_J\frac{\partial g_J}{\partial\bar{z}_{j}}d\bar{z}_j\wedge d\bar{z}_{J\setminus\lbrace j \rbrace} \in (d\bar{z}_1, \dots, d\bar{z}_{k}),
\end{align}$$

therefore we can apply the induction hypothesis to it, there exists $\eta\in\mathcal{A}_{\Complex ^n}^{0,q-1}(U)$ such that

$$\omega-\bar{\partial}\tilde{\psi}=\bar{\partial}\eta \quad \text{on} \quad \Delta_{\varepsilon}^n(0)$$

and $\zeta:=\eta+\tilde{\psi}$ ends the induction step. QED

The previous lemma can be generalised by admitting polydiscs with $\varepsilon_k=+\infty$ for some of the components of the polyradius.

Lemma (extended Dolbeault-Grothendieck). If $\Delta_\varepsilon^n(0)$ is an open polydisc with $\varepsilon_k\in\R \cup \lbrace +\infty \rbrace$ and $q>0$, then $H^{p,q}_{\bar{\partial}}(\Delta_\varepsilon^n(0))=0.$

Proof. We consider two cases: $\alpha\in\mathcal{A}_{\Complex^n}^{p,q+1}(U), q>0$ and $\alpha\in\mathcal{A}_{\Complex^n}^{p,1}(U)$.

Case 1. Let $\alpha\in\mathcal{A}_{\Complex^n}^{p,q+1}(U), q>0$, and we cover $\Delta_\varepsilon^n(0)$ with polydiscs $\overline{\Delta_i} \subset\Delta_{i+1}$, then by the Dolbeault–Grothendieck lemma we can find forms $\beta_i$ of bidegree $(p,q-1)$ on $\overline{\Delta_i}\subseteq U_i$ open such that $\alpha |_{\Delta_i} = \bar{\partial} \beta_i$; we want to show that

$$\beta_{i+1}|_{\Delta_i}=\beta_i.$$

We proceed by induction on $i$: the case when $i=1$ holds by the previous lemma. Let the claim be true for $k>1$ and take $\Delta_{k+1}$ with

$$\Delta_{\varepsilon}^n(0)=\bigcup_{i=1}^{k+1}\Delta_i \quad \text{and} \quad \overline{\Delta_k}\subset\Delta_{k+1}.$$

Then we find a $(p,q-1)$-form $\beta'_{k+1}$ defined in an open neighbourhood of $\overline{\Delta_{k+1}}$ such that $\alpha|_{\Delta_{k+1}}=\bar{\partial}\beta_{k+1}$. Let $U_k$ be an open neighbourhood of $\overline{\Delta_k}$ then $\bar{\partial}(\beta_k-\beta'_{k+1})=0$ on $U_k$ and we can apply again the Dolbeault-Grothendieck lemma to find a $(p,q-2)$-form $\gamma_k$ such that $\beta_k-\beta'_{k+1}=\bar{\partial}\gamma_k$ on $\Delta_k$. Now, let $V_k$ be an open set with $\overline{\Delta_k} \subset V_k \subsetneq U_k$ and $\rho_k: \Delta_\varepsilon^n(0)\to\R$ a smooth function such that:

$$\operatorname{supp}(\rho_k)\subset U_k, \qquad \rho|_{V_k}=1, \qquad \rho_k|_{\Delta_\varepsilon^n(0)\setminus U_k}=0.$$

Then $\rho_k\gamma_k$ is a well-defined smooth form on $\Delta_\varepsilon^n(0)$ which satisfies

$$\beta_k=\beta'_{k+1}+\bar{\partial}(\gamma_k\rho_k) \quad \text{on} \quad \Delta_{k},$$

hence the form

$$\beta_{k+1}:=\beta'_{k+1}+\bar{\partial}(\gamma_k\rho_k)$$

satisfies

$$\begin{align}
\beta_{k+1}|_{\Delta_k}  &=\beta'_{k+1}+\bar{\partial}\gamma_k=\beta_k\\
\bar{\partial}\beta_{k+1}&=\bar{\partial}\beta'_{k+1}=\alpha|_{\Delta_{k+1}}
\end{align}$$

Case 2. If instead $\alpha\in\mathcal{A}_{\Complex^n}^{p,1}(U),$ we cannot apply the Dolbeault-Grothendieck lemma twice; we take $\beta_i$ and $\Delta_i$ as before, we want to show that

$$\left \| \left. \left ({\beta_i}_I-{\beta_{i+1}}_I \right ) \right |_{\Delta_{k-1}} \right \|_\infty<2^{-i}.$$

Again, we proceed by induction on $i$: for $i=1$ the answer is given by the Dolbeault-Grothendieck lemma. Next we suppose that the claim is true for $k>1$. We take $\Delta_{k+1}\supset\overline{\Delta_k}$ such that $\Delta_{k+1}\cup\lbrace\Delta_i\rbrace_{i=1}^k$ covers $\Delta_\varepsilon^n(0)$, then we can find a $(p,0)$-form $\beta'_{k+1}$ such that

$$\alpha|_{\Delta_{k+1}}=\bar{\partial}\beta'_{k+1},$$

which also satisfies $\bar{\partial}(\beta_k-\beta'_{k+1})=0$ on $\Delta_k$, i.e. $\beta_k-\beta'_{k+1}$ is a holomorphic $(p,0)$-form wherever defined, hence by the Stone–Weierstrass theorem we can write it as

$$\beta_k-\beta'_{k+1}=\sum_{|I|=p}(P_I+r_I)dz_I$$

where $P_I$ are polynomials and

$$\left \| r_I|_{\Delta_{k-1}} \right \|_\infty<2^{-k},$$

but then the form

$$\beta_{k+1}:=\beta'_{k+1}+\sum_{|I|=p}P_Idz_I$$

satisfies

$$\begin{align}
\bar{\partial}\beta_{k+1}&=\bar{\partial}\beta'_{k+1}=\alpha|_{\Delta_{k+1}}\\
\left \| ({\beta_k}_I-{\beta_{k+1}}_I)|_{\Delta_{k-1}} \right \|_\infty&=\| r_I\|_\infty<2^{-k}
\end{align}$$

which completes the induction step; therefore we have built a sequence $\lbrace\beta_i\rbrace_{i\in\N}$ which uniformly converges to some $(p,0)$-form $\beta$ such that $\alpha|_{\Delta_{\varepsilon}^n(0)}=\bar{\partial}\beta$. QED

== Dolbeault's theorem ==
Dolbeault's theorem is a complex analog of de Rham's theorem. It asserts that the Dolbeault cohomology is isomorphic to the sheaf cohomology of the sheaf of holomorphic differential forms. Specifically,

$$H^{p,q}(M)\cong H^q(M,\Omega^p)$$

where $\Omega^p$ is the sheaf of holomorphic p forms on M.

A version of the Dolbeault theorem also holds for Dolbeault cohomology with coefficients in a holomorphic vector bundle $E$. Namely one has an isomorphism

$$H^{p,q}(M,E) \cong H^q(M, \Omega^{p} \otimes E).$$

A version for logarithmic forms has also been established.

=== Proof ===
Let $\mathcal{F}^{p,q}$ be the fine sheaf of $C^{\infty}$ forms of type $(p,q)$. Then the $\overline{\partial}$-Poincaré lemma says that the sequence

$$\Omega^{p,q} \xrightarrow{\overline{\partial}} \mathcal{F}^{p,q+1}\xrightarrow{\overline{\partial}} \mathcal{F}^{p,q+2} \xrightarrow{\overline{\partial}} \cdots$$

is exact. Like any long exact sequence, this sequence breaks up into short exact sequences. The long exact sequences of cohomology corresponding to these give the result, once one uses that the higher cohomologies of a fine sheaf vanish.

== Explicit example of calculation ==
The Dolbeault cohomology of the $n$-dimensional complex projective space is

$$H^{p,q}_{\bar{\partial}}(P^n_{\Complex})=\begin{cases}\Complex & p=q\\ 0 &\text{otherwise}\end{cases}$$

We apply the following well-known fact from Hodge theory:

$$H_{\rm dR}^k \left (P^n_{\Complex},\Complex \right )=\bigoplus_{p+q=k}H^{p,q}_{\bar{\partial}}(P^n_{\Complex})$$

because $P^n_{\Complex}$ is a compact Kähler complex manifold. Then $b_{2k+1}=0$ and

$$b_{2k}=h^{k,k}+\sum_{p+q=2k,p\ne q}h^{p,q}=1.$$

Furthermore we know that $P^n_{\Complex}$ is Kähler, and $0\ne[\omega^k]\in H^{k,k}_{\bar{\partial}}(P^n_{\Complex}),$ where $\omega$ is the fundamental form associated to the Fubini–Study metric (which is indeed Kähler), therefore $h^{k,k}=1$ and $h^{p,q}=0$ whenever $p\ne q,$ which yields the result.

== See also ==
- Serre duality
- $\partial \bar \partial$-lemma, which describes the potential of a $\bar \partial$-exact differential form in the setting of compact Kähler manifolds.
