= Local invariant cycle theorem =

Invariant cycle theorem

In mathematics, the local invariant cycle theorem was originally a conjecture of Griffiths which states that, given a surjective proper map $p$ from a Kähler manifold $X$ to the unit disk that has maximal rank everywhere except over 0, each cohomology class on $p^{-1}(t), t \ne 0$ is the restriction of some cohomology class on the entire $X$ if the cohomology class is invariant under a circle action (monodromy action); in short,

$$\operatorname{H}^*(X) \to \operatorname{H}^*(p^{-1}(t))^{S^1}$$

is surjective. The conjecture was first proved by Clemens. The theorem is also a consequence of the BBD decomposition.

Deligne also proved the following. Given a proper morphism $X \to S$ over the spectrum $S$ of the henselization of $k[T]$, $k$ an algebraically closed field, if $X$ is essentially smooth over $k$ and $X_{\overline{\eta}}$ smooth over $\overline{\eta}$, then the homomorphism on $\mathbb{Q}$-cohomology:

$$\operatorname{H}^*(X_s) \to \operatorname{H}^*(X_{\overline{\eta}})^{\operatorname{Gal}(\overline{\eta}/\eta)}$$

is surjective, where $s, \eta$ are the special and generic points and the homomorphism is the composition $\operatorname{H}^*(X_s) \simeq \operatorname{H}^*(X) \to \operatorname{H}^*(X_{\eta}) \to \operatorname{H}^*(X_{\overline{\eta}}).$

== See also ==
- Hodge theory
