= Fujiki class C =

In algebraic geometry, a complex manifold is called Fujiki class $\mathcal{C}$ if it is bimeromorphic to a compact Kähler manifold. This notion was defined by Akira Fujiki.

== Properties ==
Let M be a compact manifold of Fujiki class $\mathcal{C}$, and $X\subset M$ its complex subvariety. Then X is also in Fujiki class $\mathcal{C}$ (, Lemma 4.6). Moreover, the Douady space of X (that is, the moduli of deformations of a subvariety $X\subset M$, M fixed) is compact and in Fujiki class $\mathcal{C}$.

Fujiki class $\mathcal{C}$ manifolds are examples of compact complex manifolds which are not necessarily Kähler, but for which the $\partial \bar \partial$-lemma holds.

== Conjectures ==
J.-P. Demailly and M. Pǎun have shown that a manifold is in Fujiki class $\mathcal{C}$ if and only if it supports a Kähler current. They also conjectured that a manifold M is in Fujiki class $\mathcal{C}$ if it admits a nef current which is big, that is, satisfies

$$\int_M \omega^{{dim_{\mathbb C} M}}>0.$$

For a cohomology class $[\omega]\in H^2(M)$ which is rational, this statement is known: by Grauert-Riemenschneider conjecture, a holomorphic line bundle L with first Chern class

$$c_1(L)=[\omega]$$

nef and big has maximal Kodaira dimension, hence the corresponding rational map to

$${\mathbb P} H^0(L^N)$$

is generically finite onto its image, which is algebraic, and therefore Kähler.

Fujiki and Ueno asked whether the property $\mathcal{C}$ is stable under deformations. This conjecture was disproven in 1992 by Y.-S. Poon and Claude LeBrun
