= Complex differential form =

Differential form on a manifold which is permitted to have complex coefficients

In mathematics, a complex differential form is a differential form on a manifold (usually a complex manifold) which is permitted to have complex coefficients.

Complex forms have broad applications in differential geometry. On complex manifolds, they are fundamental and serve as the basis for much of algebraic geometry, Kähler geometry, and Hodge theory. Over non-complex manifolds, they also play a role in the study of almost complex structures, the theory of spinors, and CR structures.

Typically, complex forms are considered because of some desirable decomposition that the forms admit. On a complex manifold, for instance, any complex k-form can be decomposed uniquely into a sum of so-called (p, q)-forms: roughly, wedges of p differentials of the holomorphic coordinates with q differentials of their complex conjugates. The ensemble of (p, q)-forms becomes the primitive object of study, and determines a finer geometrical structure on the manifold than the k-forms. Even finer structures exist, for example, in cases where Hodge theory applies.

== Differential forms on a complex manifold ==
Suppose that M is a complex manifold of complex dimension n. Then there is a local coordinate system consisting of n complex-valued functions z^{1}, ..., z^{n} such that the coordinate transitions from one patch to another are holomorphic functions of these variables. The space of complex forms carries a rich structure, depending fundamentally on the fact that these transition functions are holomorphic, rather than just smooth.

=== One-forms ===
We begin with the case of one-forms. First decompose the complex coordinates into their real and imaginary parts: z^{j} = x^{j} + iy^{j} for each j. Letting

$$dz^j=dx^j+idy^j,\quad d\bar{z}^j=dx^j-idy^j,$$

one sees that any differential form with complex coefficients can be written uniquely as a sum

$$\sum_{j=1}^n\left(f_jdz^j+g_jd\bar{z}^j\right).$$

Let Ω^{1,0} be the space of complex differential forms containing only $dz$'s and Ω^{0,1} be the space of forms containing only $d\bar{z}$'s. One can show, by the Cauchy–Riemann equations, that the spaces Ω^{1,0} and Ω^{0,1} are stable under holomorphic coordinate changes. In other words, if one makes a different choice w_{i} of holomorphic coordinate system, then elements of Ω^{1,0} transform tensorially, as do elements of Ω^{0,1}. Thus the spaces Ω^{0,1} and Ω^{1,0} determine complex vector bundles on the complex manifold.

=== Higher-degree forms ===
The wedge product of complex differential forms is defined in the same way as with real forms. Let p and q be a pair of non-negative integers ≤ n. The space Ω^{p,q} of (p, q)-forms is defined by taking linear combinations of the wedge products of p elements from Ω^{1,0} and q elements from Ω^{0,1}. Symbolically,

$$\Omega^{p,q} = \underbrace{\Omega^{1,0} \wedge \cdots \wedge \Omega^{1,0}}_{p \text{ times}} \wedge \underbrace{\Omega^{0,1} \wedge \cdots \wedge \Omega^{0,1}}_{q \text{ times}}$$

where there are p factors of Ω^{1,0} and q factors of Ω^{0,1}. Just as with the two spaces of 1-forms, these are stable under holomorphic changes of coordinates, and so determine vector bundles.

If E^{k} is the space of all complex differential forms of total degree k, then each element of E^{k} can be expressed in a unique way as a linear combination of elements from among the spaces Ω^{p,q} with p + q = k. More succinctly, there is a direct sum decomposition

$$E^k = \Omega^{k,0} \oplus \Omega^{k-1,1} \oplus \cdots \oplus \Omega^{1,k-1} \oplus \Omega^{0,k} = \bigoplus_{p+q=k} \Omega^{p,q}.$$

Because this direct sum decomposition is stable under holomorphic coordinate changes, it also determines a vector bundle decomposition.

In particular, for each k and each p and q with p + q = k, there is a canonical projection of vector bundles

$$\pi^{p,q} : E^k \to \Omega^{p,q}.$$

=== The Dolbeault operators ===
The usual exterior derivative defines a mapping of sections $d: \Omega^{r} \to \Omega^{r+1}$ via

$$d(\Omega^{p,q}) \subseteq \bigoplus_{r + s = p + q + 1} \Omega^{r,s}$$

The exterior derivative does not in itself reflect the more rigid complex structure of the manifold.

Using d and the projections defined in the previous subsection, it is possible to define the Dolbeault operators:

$$\partial=\pi^{p+1,q}\circ d:\Omega^{p,q}\rightarrow\Omega^{p+1,q},\quad \bar{\partial}=\pi^{p,q+1}\circ d:\Omega^{p,q}\rightarrow\Omega^{p,q+1}$$

To describe these operators in local coordinates, let

$$\alpha=\sum_{|I|=p,|J|=q}\ f_{IJ}\,dz^I\wedge d\bar{z}^J\in\Omega^{p,q}$$

where I and J are multi-indices. Then

$$\partial\alpha=\sum_{I,J}\sum_\ell \frac{\partial f_{IJ}}{\partial z^\ell}\,dz^\ell\wedge dz^I\wedge d\bar{z}^J$$
$$\bar{\partial}\alpha=\sum_{I,J}\sum_\ell \frac{\partial f_{IJ}}{\partial \bar{z}^\ell}d\bar{z}^\ell\wedge dz^I\wedge d\bar{z}^J.$$

The following properties are seen to hold:

$$d=\partial+\bar{\partial}$$
$$\partial^2=\bar{\partial}^2=\partial\bar{\partial}+\bar{\partial}\partial=0.$$

These operators and their properties form the basis for Dolbeault cohomology and many aspects of Hodge theory.

On a star-shaped domain of a complex manifold the Dolbeault operators have dual homotopy operators that result from splitting of the homotopy operator for $d$. This is a content of the Poincaré lemma on a complex manifold.

The Poincaré lemma for $\bar \partial$ and $\partial$ can be improved further to the local $\partial \bar \partial$-lemma, which shows that every $d$-exact complex differential form is actually $\partial \bar \partial$-exact. On compact Kähler manifolds a global form of the local $\partial \bar \partial$-lemma holds, known as the $\partial \bar \partial$-lemma. It is a consequence of Hodge theory, and states that a complex differential form which is globally $d$-exact (in other words, whose class in de Rham cohomology is zero) is globally $\partial \bar \partial$-exact.

=== Holomorphic forms ===
For each p, a holomorphic p-form is a holomorphic section of the bundle Ω^{p,0}. In local coordinates, then, a holomorphic p-form can be written in the form

$$\alpha=\sum_{|I|=p}f_I\,dz^I$$

where the $f_I$ are holomorphic functions. Equivalently, and due to the independence of the complex conjugate, the (p, 0)-form α is holomorphic if and only if

$$\bar{\partial}\alpha=0.$$

The sheaf of holomorphic p-forms is often written Ω^{p}, although this can sometimes lead to confusion so many authors tend to adopt an alternative notation.

== See also ==
- Differential of the first kind
- Dolbeault complex
- Frölicher spectral sequence
