= Nahm equations =

System of ordinary differential equations

In differential geometry and gauge theory, the Nahm equations are a system of ordinary differential equations introduced by Werner Nahm in the context of the Nahm transform – an alternative to Ward's twistor construction of monopoles. The Nahm equations are formally analogous to the algebraic equations in the ADHM construction of instantons (Nigel Hitchin called them a "bold adaptation"), where finite order matrices are replaced by differential operators.

Deep study of the Nahm equations was carried out by Nigel Hitchin and Simon Donaldson. Conceptually, the equations arise in the process of infinite-dimensional hyperkähler reduction. They can also be viewed as a dimensional reduction of the anti-self-dual Yang-Mills equations. Among their many applications we can mention: Hitchin's construction of monopoles, where this approach is critical for establishing nonsingularity of monopole solutions; Donaldson's description of the moduli space of monopoles; and the existence of hyperkähler structure on coadjoint orbits of complex semisimple Lie groups, proved by Kronheimer, Biquard, and Kovalev.

== Equations ==
Let $T_1(z), T_2(z), T_3(z)$ be three matrix-valued meromorphic functions of a complex variable $z$. The Nahm equations are a system of matrix differential equations

$$\begin{align}
\frac{dT_1}{dz}&=[T_2,T_3]\\[3pt]
\frac{dT_2}{dz}&=[T_3,T_1]\\[3pt]
\frac{dT_3}{dz}&=[T_1,T_2],
\end{align}$$

together with certain analyticity properties, reality conditions, and boundary conditions. The three equations can be written concisely using the Levi-Civita symbol, in the form

$$\frac{dT_i}{dz}=\frac{1}{2}\sum_{j,k}\epsilon_{ijk}[T_j,T_k]=\sum_{j,k}\epsilon_{ijk}T_j T_k.$$

More generally, instead of just considering $N \times N$ matrices, one can consider Nahm's equations with values in a Lie algebra $\mathfrak{g}$.

=== Additional conditions ===
One often considers the Nahm equations with boundary and reality conditions dependent on the context.

In the original context of $SU(2)$ monopoles the variable $z$ is restricted to the open interval $(0,2)$, and the following conditions are imposed:

1. $T^*_i = -T_i;$
2. $T_i(2-z)=T_i(z)^{T};\,$
3. $T_i$ can be continued to a meromorphic function of $z$ in a neighborhood of the closed interval $[0,2]$, analytic outside of $0$ and $2$, and with simple poles at $z = 0$ and $z = 2$; and
4. At the poles, the residues of $T_1, T_2, T_3$ form the $N$-dimensional irreducible representation of the group SU(2).

== Nahm–Hitchin description of monopoles ==
There is a natural equivalence between

1. the monopoles of charge $K$ for the group $SU(2)$, modulo gauge transformations, and
2. the solutions of Nahm equations satisfying the additional conditions above, modulo the simultaneous conjugation of $T_1, T_2, T_3$ by the group $O(k,R)$.

== Lax representation ==
The Nahm equations can be written in the Lax form as follows. Set

$$\begin{align}
& A_0=T_1+iT_2, \quad A_1=-2i T_3, \quad A_2=T_1-iT_2 \\[3 pt]
& A(\zeta)=A_0+\zeta A_1+\zeta^2 A_2, \quad B(\zeta)=\frac{1}{2}\frac{dA}{d\zeta}=\frac{1}{2}A_1+\zeta A_2,
\end{align}$$

then the system of Nahm equations is equivalent to the Lax equation

$$\frac{dA}{dz}=[A,B].$$

As an immediate corollary, we obtain that the spectrum of the matrix $A$ does not depend on $z$. Therefore, the characteristic equation

$$\det(\lambda I+A(\zeta,z))=0,$$

which determines the so-called spectral curve in the twistor space $T\mathbb{P}^1$ is invariant under the flow in $z$. Moreover, the flow of the ODE linearises on the Jacobian variety of the spectral curve

== See also ==
- Bogomolny equation
- Yang–Mills–Higgs equations
