= Laura Schaposnik =

Argentine and American mathematician

Laura Patricia Schaposnik Massolo (born 1985) is an Argentine and American mathematician working in algebraic geometry and mathematical physics. She is a professor in the Department of Mathematics, Statistics, and Computer Science at the University of Illinois Chicago.

== Education and career ==
Schaposnik was born in 1985 in La Plata. She became a mathematics student at the National University of La Plata, where she received a licenciate (the Argentine equivalent of a master's degree) in 2008. She finished her studies early, as the top student of her year at the National University of La Plata, and became known as "la chica 10" for her perfect scores in all her exams. During her studies, she was also a piano student at the Gilardo Gilardi Conservatory of Music, and won a medal in a digital photography competition at the university.

She continued her studies in mathematics at the University of Oxford in England, as a member of New College, Oxford, under the supervision of Nigel Hitchin. Her 2013 doctoral dissertation was Spectral data for G-Higgs bundles. During this period she also worked as a lecturer and research assistant at Oxford and the University of Heidelberg in Germany.

Next, she became a postdoctoral researcher and L. Doob Research Assistant Professor at the University of Illinois Urbana-Champaign from 2013 to 2015. In 2015, she took an assistant professorship at the University of Illinois Chicago; she was promoted to associate professor in 2018 and full professor in 2022.

== Research ==
Schaposnik research topics include the geometry of moduli spaces of Higgs bundles and Hitchin systems, and their connections to the theory of branes in mathematical physics.

She has also studied topics in the applications of mathematics to behavioral science, bio-inspired computing, and patterns in nature, including rumor spread in social networks, gender patterns in how people carry their cellphones, and the structure and relations among viruses.

== Recognition ==
Schaposnik was a 2025 recipient of the Presidential Early Career Award for Scientists and Engineers.

== Personal life ==
Schaposnik is the daughter of two Argentine physicists, Fidel A. Schaposnik, and Claudia Patricia Massolo. Her brother, Fidel I. Schaposnik, is also a physicist. She is married to James Unwin, a physicist at the University of Illinois Chicago. they have two children.

Schaposnik is the author and publisher of several children's books in both Spanish and English, including Ene and the Magic Boxes: An Odyssey Through The World Of Artisans, and (with Unwin) Reaching for the Stars.
