= Erich Kähler =

German mathematician (1906–2000)

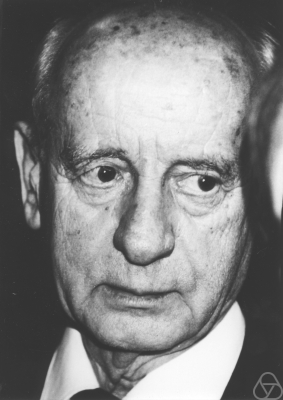
- Erich Kähler in Hamburg, 1990
- Born: 16 January 1906; Leipzig, German Empire
- Died: 31 May 2000 (aged 94); Wedel, Germany
- Citizenship: German
- Education: University of Leipzig
- Known for: Kähler differential Cartan–Kähler theorem Kähler manifold Dirac–Kähler equation
- Spouse(s): Luise Günther, Charlotte Schulze
- Awards: Saxon Academy of Sciences and Humanities (1949), Berlin Academy of Science (1955), German National Academy of Sciences Leopoldina (1957), Accademia dei Lincei (1957), Hamburg Mathematical Society (1976), Istituto Lombardo Accademia di Scienze e Lettere (1992)
- Scientific career
- Fields: Mathematics
- Workplaces: University of Leipzig, University of Königsberg, University of Hamburg, Technische Universität Berlin
- Thesis: Über die Existenz von Gleichgewichtsfiguren, die sich aus gewissen Lösungen des n-Körperproblems ableiten (On the existence of equilibrium solutions of rotating liquids, which are derived from certain solutions of the n-body problem) (1928)
- Doctoral advisor: Leon Lichtenstein

Erich Kähler (German: [ˈkɛːlɐ]; 16 January 1906 – 31 May 2000) was a German mathematician with wide-ranging interests in geometry and mathematical physics, who laid important mathematical groundwork for algebraic geometry and for string theory.

== Education and life ==
=== Early life ===
Erich Kähler was born in Leipzig, the son of a telegraph inspector Ernst Kähler. Inspired as a boy to be an explorer after reading books about Sven Hedin that his mother Elsa Götsch had given to him, the young Kähler soon focused his passion for exploration on astronomy. He is said to have written a 50-page thesis on fractional differentiation while still in high school, hoping that it would earn him a PhD. His teachers replied that he would have to attend university courses first.

=== Beginning of career ===
Kähler enrolled in the University of Leipzig in 1924. He read Galois theory, met the mathematician Emil Artin, and did research under the supervision of Leon Lichtenstein. Still fascinated by celestial mechanics, Kähler wrote a dissertation entitled On the existence of equilibrium solutions of rotating liquids, which are derived from certain solutions of the n-body problem, and received his doctorate in 1928. He continued his studies at Leipzig for the following year, supported by fellowship from the Notgemeinschaft der Deutschen Wissenschaften, except for a research assistantship at the University of Königsberg in 1929. In 1930 Kähler joined the Department of Mathematics at the University of Hamburg to work under the direction of Wilhelm Blaschke, writing a habilitation thesis entitled, "About the integrals of algebraic equations". He took a year in Rome to work with Italian geometers including Enriques, Castelnuovo, Levi-Civita, Severi, and Segre in 1931-1932, which led him to publish his acclaimed work on what are now called Kähler metrics in 1932. Kähler returned to Hamburg after his year in Rome, where he continued to work until going to the University of Konigsberg in 1935, and was offered an ordinary professorship a year later. In 1938 he married his first wife Luise Günther.

=== World War II ===
In the years leading up to World War II Kähler was a supporter of Hitler and of German nationalism, and reported that he volunteered for the German military in 1935, joined the navy in 1937, and the army on 24 August 1939 before the invasion of Poland. After being stationed at the Saint-Nazaire submarine base in German Occupied France towards the end of the war, Kähler was captured by the Allies and taken to the prisoner of war camp at Ile de Ré, and then to another camp in Mulsanne. Thanks to the French physicist Frederic Joliot-Curie and mathematician Élie Cartan, Kähler was able to study mathematics during this time, receiving books and mathematics papers and working during his imprisonment. He was released in 1947. He reported that his oath to Hitler (as a civil servant) was important to him, and remained an apologist for the Third Reich decades later, in a 1988 interview with Sanford Segal. A former student reported in 1988 that he kept a Nazi navy flag in his office.

=== Later life ===
After his release as a prisoner of war Kähler returned to the University of Hamburg to take up a temporary lectureship. He accepted a professorship in 1948 at his alma mater the University of Leipzig, filling a post that had been left open by the death of Paul Koebe in 1945. But in this same year, Soviet occupation authorities began transferring administrative in the region to German communist leaders, and from October 1949 the region was a part of newly-formed East Germany. Kähler became increasingly unhappy with life in East Germany over the next decade, finally deciding to leave in 1958 to take up a lectureship at Technische Universität Berlin. There he was heralded as among the greatest living mathematicians, and his lectures overflowed with 600 students from engineering and the sciences. In 1964 he returned to the University of Hamburg to fill the post that opened when Artin died in 1962. His wife Luise became ill and died in 1970, and Kähler married his second wife Charlotte Schulze, who was the widow of his brother who had died in the war. Kähler remained at the University of Hamburg until his retirement in 1974.

After retiring Kähler remained an active researcher, writing a number of important papers on the foundations of physics and the Poincaré group, as well as a number of philosophical papers.

== Contributions ==
As a mathematician Kähler is known for a number of contributions: the Cartan–Kähler theorem on solutions of non-linear analytic differential systems; the idea of a Kähler metric on complex manifolds; and the Kähler differentials, which provide a purely algebraic theory and have generally been adopted in algebraic geometry. In all of these the theory of differential forms plays a part, and Kähler counts as a major developer of the theory from its formal genesis with Élie Cartan.

Kähler manifolds — complex manifolds endowed with a Riemannian metric and a symplectic form so that the three structures are mutually compatible — are named after him.

The K3 surface is named after Kummer, Kähler, and Kodaira.

His earlier work was on celestial mechanics; and he was one of the forerunners of scheme theory, though his ideas on that were never widely adopted.

== See also ==
- Almost complex manifold
- Complex Poisson manifold
- Hyper-Kähler manifold
- Hyperkähler quotient
- Kähler quotient
- Kähler–Einstein metric
- Nearly Kähler manifold
- Quaternion-Kähler manifold
- Special Kähler geometry

== Sources ==
- KÄHLER, Erich Ernst International Who's Who. accessed September 3, 2006.
- Erich Kähler at the Mathematics Genealogy Project
