= Steven Rayan =

Canadian mathematician

- Born: Greater Sudbury, Ontario, Canada
- Citizenship: Canadian
- Education: Queen's University at Kingston; McGill University; University of Oxford
- Known for: Higgs bundles; hyperbolic band theory; quantum topology
- Awards: Cozzarelli Prize finalist (2023); Member, College of the Royal Society of Canada (2025)
- Scientific career
- Fields: Algebraic geometry, mathematical physics, quantum information science
- Workplaces: University of Saskatchewan
- Doctoral advisor: Nigel Hitchin

Steven Rayan is a Canadian mathematician and scientist whose work concerns algebraic geometry, mathematical physics, quantum information science, and quantum computing. He is a professor in the Department of Mathematics and Statistics at the University of Saskatchewan, where he is also director of the Centre for Quantum Topology and Its Applications (quanTA). In 2025, he was elected a member of the College of the Royal Society of Canada.

== Education and career ==
Rayan earned a Bachelor of Science (Honours) degree from Queen's University at Kingston in 2006 and a Master of Science degree from McGill University in 2007. He completed a doctorate in mathematics at the University of Oxford in 2011, where he was a Commonwealth Scholar at Balliol College and was supervised by Nigel Hitchin.

After holding a postdoctoral fellowship at the University of Toronto between 2011 and 2016, Rayan joined the University of Saskatchewan in 2016 as a faculty member. He was promoted to full professor in 2022. He founded and directs the Centre for Quantum Topology and Its Applications (quanTA), which was ratified as a University of Saskatchewan research centre in 2019.

== Research ==
Rayan's early research concerned Higgs bundles, co-Higgs bundles, and their moduli spaces in algebraic, symplectic, and differential geometry. His doctoral thesis studied the geometry of co-Higgs bundles, and subsequent work included papers on the existence and local moduli of co-Higgs bundles over projective spaces, the topology of Higgs bundle moduli spaces and other related moduli spaces, and nonabelian Hodge theory. Among the related moduli spaces are Nakajima quiver varieties, including hyperpolygon spaces, which he has studied in connection with the Hitchin system, the Gelfand-Zeitlin system, and resolutions of singularities. In later work with Gwyn Bellamy, Alastair Craw, Travis Schedler, and Hartmut Weiss, he studied crepant resolutions of a finite quotient singularity and showed that the 81 projective crepant resolutions of the quotient singularity associated with an exceptional subgroup of Sp(4, ℂ) can be realized as hyperpolygon spaces.

Rayan has also worked on geometric questions in mathematical physics. With Dmitrii Chouchkov, Nicholas Ercolani, and Israel Michael Sigal, he studied Ginzburg–Landau equations on compact Riemann surfaces of higher genus.

With his student Mahmud Azam, Rayan has studied connections between topological quantum field theory and quantum computing. Their work models quantum circuits as images of modified cobordisms under monoidal double functors, relating circuit diagrams to TQFT-type functorial constructions.

With Joseph Maciejko, Rayan developed hyperbolic band theory, a proposed extension of Bloch theory from Euclidean crystals to hyperbolic lattices. The work was motivated in part by experimental constructions of hyperbolic lattices in circuit quantum electrodynamics and was referenced in Scientific American in connection with the geometric Langlands conjecture. A follow-up paper by Maciejko and Rayan, Automorphic Bloch theorems for hyperbolic lattices, developed a generalized Bloch theorem for finite hyperbolic lattices. That paper was named the runner-up for the 2022 Cozzarelli Prize of the National Academy of Sciences in the Physical and Mathematical Sciences class. Translating some of these perspectives towards quantum information, Rayan and his students have developed a systematic framework for constructing hyperbolic quantum error correction codes.

His applied quantum computing work has included quantum algorithms and quantum machine learning methods for scientific use cases. At the 2025 IEEE International Conference on Quantum Computing and Engineering, he and collaborators presented work applying gate-based quantum computing to protein co-regulatory network logic and work on direct entanglement ansatz learning on error-prone superconducting qubits.

== Quantum research organization ==
Through the quanTA Centre at the University of Saskatchewan, Rayan has been heavily involved in organizing quantum research activities at the university and in the surrounding region. In 2020, he authored an invited article for the Canadian Science Policy Centre on quantum innovation in Canada. In 2026, the University of Saskatchewan announced that it would acquire a full-stack, open-architecture quantum computer for research and education, with Rayan as principal investigator and quanTA as the operating centre.

== Selected honours ==
- Ethel Raybould Visiting Fellow, School of Mathematics and Physics, University of Queensland, 2018.
- Finalist for the 2022 Cozzarelli Prize in the Physical and Mathematical Sciences class, 2023.
- H. N. Gupta Memorial Lecturer, University of Regina, 2024.
- Plenary lecturer, Canadian Mathematical Society Winter Meeting, 2024.
- Member of the College of the Royal Society of Canada, elected November 2025.
