= Ulf Lindström =

Swedish physicist

- Born: 12 November 1947 (age 78); Stockholm, Sweden
- Education: Stockholm University
- Scientific career
- Fields: Physics
- Workplaces: Uppsala University
- Thesis: Extensions of general relativity: scalar tensor theory, topology of space-time and supergravity
- Doctoral advisor: Bertel Laurent

Ulf Lindström (born 12 November 1947) is a Swedish theoretical physicist working in the fields of string theory, supersymmetry, and general relativity.

He earned his fil. kand. university degree at Stockholm University in 1972 and continued under the supervision of Bertel Laurent with doctoral studies. The title of his PhD thesis was "Extensions of general relativity: scalar tensor theory, topology of space-time and supergravity."

He spent the year 1978-1979 at Brandeis University as a post-doc working with Stanley Deser, and after getting his doctoral degree, became a docent in Stockholm. During 1986-1987, he spent time as a research fellow at Stony Brook University. In 2002 he moved from Stockholm University to Uppsala University where he is now the chairman of the theoretical physics department.

His most well-known contributions to theoretical physics are in the field of supersymmetry where he was one of the first people to discuss the hyper-Kähler quotient construction which was later generalized and discussed in full detail by Hitchin, Karlhede, Lindström and Roček. Also, together with Martin Roček, he has developed the notion of "projective superspace". Another important result was the construction (together with Paul Howe) of an eight-loop counterterm in N=8 supergravity which became part of the motivation to consider string theory as the major candidate for a finite quantum theory of gravity. He was also among the first to discuss the zero-tension limit of string theory and has lately been involved in developing the notion (introduced by Nigel Hitchin) of generalized complex geometry.

He has for many years been the chairman of the Oskar Klein Memorial Lecture committee. A conference was held in honor of his 60th birthday in November 2007.
