= Horrocks construction =

Method for constructing vector bundles

In mathematics, the Horrocks construction is a method for constructing vector bundles, especially over projective spaces, introduced by Geoffrey Horrocks (1964, section 10). His original construction gave an example of an indecomposable rank 2 vector bundle over 3-dimensional projective space, and generalizes to give examples of vector bundles of higher ranks over other projective spaces. The Horrocks construction is used in the ADHM construction to construct instantons over the 4-sphere.
