= Oscar Garcia Prada =

Spanish mathematician

Oscar García-Prada (born 20 February 1960) is a Spanish mathematician working in the fields of differential geometry, algebraic geometry and mathematical physics.

== Career ==
García-Prada is a research professor of the Spanish National Research Council (CSIC) at the Institute of Mathematical Sciences (ICMAT, Madrid). His research interests lie in the study of moduli spaces and geometric structures, including moduli spaces of vortices, moduli spaces of Higgs bundles and their relation to character varieties of surface groups and higher Teichmüller theory. He had published more than 80 research papers and books, including the appendix to Wells' Differential Analysis on Complex Manifolds.

After undergraduate studies in physics and mathematics at the University of Valladolid and University of Barcelona, and a master's degree in mathematics at Rice University in Houston, Texas. García-Prada obtained a D.Phil. in mathematics at the University of Oxford in 1991 under the supervision of Simon Donaldson and Nigel Hitchin. He had postdoctoral appointments at the Institut des Hautes Études Scientifiques (Paris), University of California at Berkeley and Université de Paris-Sud, before holding positions at Universidad Autónoma de Madrid and École Polytéchnique (Paris). In 2002 he joined the Spanish National Research Council (CSIC).

In parallel with his mathematical work, he carries out a musical activity, singing as a countertenor specialised in the early music repertoire, offering recitals in several countries in Europe.
