= ADHM =

ADHM may refer to:

- ADHM construction in mathematical physics
- Advanced Healthcare Materials, a scientific journal which uses the adhm abbreviation for its digital object identifier
- Ae Dil Hai Mushkil, a 2016 Indian film
- Airtel Delhi Half Marathon
