= Geoffrey Horrocks =

Geoffrey Horrocks may refer to:

- Geoffrey Horrocks (mathematician) (1932/33 – 2012), British mathematician
- Geoffrey Horrocks (philologist) (born 1951), British philologist
