= Geoffrey Horrocks (mathematician) =

British mathematician (1920s–2012)

Geoffrey Horrocks (1932/33 Leicester – 12 September 2012) was a British mathematician working on vector bundles, who introduced the Horrocks construction used in the ADHM construction, and the Horrocks–Mumford bundle and monads.

He was a professor at Newcastle University until his retirement in 1998.

== Publications ==
- Horrocks, G. (1964), "Vector bundles on the punctured spectrum of a local ring", Proceedings of the London Mathematical Society, Third Series, 14 (4): 689–713, doi:10.1112/plms/s3-14.4.689, ISSN 0024-6115, MR 0169877
- Horrocks, G.; Mumford, D. (1973), "A rank 2 vector bundle on P^{4} with 15000 symmetries", Topology, 12: 63–81, doi:10.1016/0040-9383(73)90022-0, MR 0382279
