= Bogomolny equations =

Equations describing magnetic monopoles

In mathematics, and especially gauge theory, the Bogomolny equation for magnetic monopoles is the equation

$$F_A = \star d_A \Phi,$$

where $F_A$ is the curvature of a connection $A$ on a principal $G$-bundle over a 3-manifold $M$, $\Phi$ is a section of the corresponding adjoint bundle, $d_A$ is the exterior covariant derivative induced by $A$ on the adjoint bundle, and $\star$ is the Hodge star operator on $M$. These equations are named after E. B. Bogomolny and were studied extensively by Michael Atiyah and Nigel Hitchin.

The equations are a dimensional reduction of the self-dual Yang–Mills equations from four dimensions to three dimensions, and correspond to global minima of the appropriate action. If $M$ is closed, there are only trivial (i.e. flat) solutions.

== See also ==
- Monopole moduli space
- Ginzburg–Landau theory
- Seiberg–Witten theory
- Bogomol'nyi–Prasad–Sommerfield bound
