= Hitchin's equations =

System of partial differential equations used in Higgs field theory

In mathematics, and in particular differential geometry and gauge theory, Hitchin's equations are a system of partial differential equations for a connection and Higgs field on a vector bundle or principal bundle over a Riemann surface, written down by Nigel Hitchin in 1987. Hitchin's equations are locally equivalent to the harmonic map equation for a surface into the symmetric space dual to the structure group. They also appear as a dimensional reduction of the self-dual Yang–Mills equations from four dimensions to two dimensions, and solutions to Hitchin's equations give examples of Higgs bundles and of holomorphic connections. The existence of solutions to Hitchin's equations on a compact Riemann surface follows from the stability of the corresponding Higgs bundle or the corresponding holomorphic connection, and this is the simplest form of the Nonabelian Hodge correspondence.

The moduli space of solutions to Hitchin's equations was constructed by Hitchin in the rank two case on a compact Riemann surface and was one of the first examples of a hyperkähler manifold constructed. The nonabelian Hodge correspondence shows it is isomorphic to the Higgs bundle moduli space, and to the moduli space of holomorphic connections. Using the metric structure on the Higgs bundle moduli space afforded by its description in terms of Hitchin's equations, Hitchin constructed the Hitchin system, a completely integrable system whose twisted generalization over a finite field was used by Ngô Bảo Châu in his proof of the fundamental lemma in the Langlands program, for which he was afforded the 2010 Fields Medal.

== Definition ==
The definition may be phrased for a connection on a vector bundle or principal bundle, with the two perspectives being essentially interchangeable. Here the definition of principal bundles is presented, which is the form that appears in Hitchin's work.

Let $P\to \Sigma$ be a principal $G$-bundle for a compact real Lie group $G$ over a compact Riemann surface. For simplicity we will consider the case of $G=\text{SU}(2)$ or $G=\text{SO}(3)$, the special unitary group or special orthogonal group. Suppose $A$ is a connection on $P$, and let $\Phi$ be a section of the complex vector bundle $\text{ad} P^{\Complex} \otimes T_{1,0}^* \Sigma$, where $\text{ad} P^{\Complex}$ is the complexification of the adjoint bundle of $P$, with fibre given by the complexification $\mathfrak{g}\otimes \Complex$ of the Lie algebra $\mathfrak{g}$ of $G$. That is, $\Phi$ is a complex $\text{ad} P$-valued $(1,0)$-form on $\Sigma$. Such a $\Phi$ is called a Higgs field in analogy with the auxiliary Higgs field appearing in Yang–Mills theory.

For a pair $(A,\Phi)$, Hitchin's equations assert that

$$\begin{cases}
F_A + [\Phi, \Phi^*] = 0\\
\bar \partial_A \Phi = 0.
\end{cases}$$

where $F_A\in \Omega^2(\Sigma, \text{ad} P)$ is the curvature form of $A$, $\bar \partial_A$ is the $(0,1)$-part of the induced connection on the complexified adjoint bundle $\text{ad} P \otimes \Complex$, and $[\Phi,\Phi^*]$ is the commutator of $\text{ad} P$-valued one-forms in the sense of Lie algebra-valued differential forms.

Since $[\Phi,\Phi^*]$ is of type $(1,1)$, Hitchin's equations assert that the $(0,2)$-component $F_A^{0,2}=0$. Since $\bar \partial_A^2 = F_A^{0,2}$, this implies that $\bar \partial_A$ is a Dolbeault operator on $\text{ad} P^{\Complex}$ and gives this Lie algebra bundle the structure of a holomorphic vector bundle. Therefore, the condition $\bar \partial_A \Phi = 0$ means that $\Phi$ is a holomorphic $\text{ad} P$-valued $(1,0)$-form on $\Sigma$. A pair consisting of a holomorphic vector bundle $E$ with a holomorphic endomorphism-valued $(1,0)$-form $\Phi$ is called a Higgs bundle, and so every solution to Hitchin's equations produces an example of a Higgs bundle.

== Derivation ==
Hitchin's equations can be derived as a dimensional reduction of the Yang–Mills equations from four dimension to two dimensions. Consider a connection $A$ on a trivial principal $G$-bundle over $\Reals^4$. Then there exists four functions $A_1,A_2,A_3,A_4: \Reals^4 \to \mathfrak{g}$ such that
$$A = A_1 dx^1 + A_2 dx^2 + A_3 dx^3 + A_4 dx^4$$
where $dx^i$ are the standard coordinate differential forms on $\Reals^4$. The self-duality equations for the connection $A$, a particular case of the Yang–Mills equations, can be written
$$\begin{cases}
F_{12} = F_{34}\\
F_{13} = F_{42}\\
F_{14} = F_{23}
\end{cases}$$
where $F = \sum_{i<j} F_{ij} dx^i \wedge dx^j$ is the curvature two-form of $A$. To dimensionally reduce to two dimensions, one imposes that the connection forms $A_i$ are independent of the coordinates $x^3,x^4$ on $\Reals^4$. Thus the components $A_1 dx^1 + A_2 dx^2$ define a connection on the restricted bundle over $\Reals^2$, and if one relabels $A_3 = \phi_1$, $A_4 = \phi_2$ then these are auxiliary $\mathfrak{g}$-valued fields over $\Reals^2$.

If one now writes $\phi = \phi_1 - i \phi_2$ and $\Phi = \frac{1}{2} \phi dz$ where $dz = dx^1 + i dx^2$ is the standard complex $(1,0)$-form on $\Reals^2 = \Complex$, then the self-duality equations above become precisely Hitchin's equations. Since these equations are conformally invariant on $\Reals^2$, they make sense on a conformal compactification of the plane, a Riemann surface.
