= Monopole moduli space =

In mathematics, the monopole moduli space is a space parametrizing monopoles (solutions of the Bogomolny equations). Atiyah and Hitchin (1988) studied the moduli space for 2 monopoles in detail and used it to describe the scattering of monopoles.

== See also ==
- Seiberg–Witten moduli space
- Hitchin system
