= Horrocks–Mumford bundle =

In algebraic geometry, the Horrocks–Mumford bundle is an indecomposable rank 2 vector bundle on 4-dimensional projective space P^{4} introduced by Geoffrey Horrocks and David Mumford (1973). It is the only such bundle known, although a generalized construction involving Paley graphs produces other rank 2 sheaves (Sasukara et al. 1993). The zero sets of sections of the Horrocks–Mumford bundle are abelian surfaces of degree 10, called Horrocks–Mumford surfaces.

By computing Chern classes one sees that the second exterior power $\wedge^2 F$ of the Horrocks–Mumford bundle F is the line bundle O(5) on P^{4}. Therefore, the zero set V of a general section of this bundle is a quintic threefold called a Horrocks–Mumford quintic. Such a V has exactly 100 nodes; there exists a small resolution V′ which is a Calabi–Yau threefold fibered by Horrocks–Mumford surfaces.

== See also ==
- List of algebraic surfaces
