= Monad (homological algebra) =

In homological algebra, a monad is a 3-term complex

A → B → C

of objects in some abelian category whose middle term B is projective, whose first map A → B is injective, and whose second map B → C is surjective. Equivalently, a monad is a projective object together with a 3-step filtration B ⊃ ker(B → C) ⊃ im(A → B). In practice A, B, and C are often vector bundles over some space, and there are several minor extra conditions that some authors add to the definition. Monads were introduced by Horrocks.

== See also ==
- ADHM construction
