= Kähler quotient =

In mathematics, specifically in complex geometry, the Kähler quotient of a Kähler manifold $X$ by a Lie group $G$ acting on $X$ by preserving the Kähler structure and with moment map $\mu : X \to \mathfrak{g}^*$ (with respect to the Kähler form) is the quotient

$$\mu^{-1}(0)/G.$$

If $G$ acts freely and properly, then $\mu^{-1}(0)/G$ is a new Kähler manifold whose Kähler form is given by the symplectic quotient construction.

By the Kempf-Ness theorem, a Kähler quotient by a compact Lie group $G$ is closely related to a geometric invariant theory quotient by the complexification of $G$.

== See also ==
- Hyperkähler quotient
