= Carlos Simpson =

American mathematician

Carlos Tschudi Simpson (born 30 June 1962) is an American mathematician, specializing in algebraic geometry.

Simpson received his Ph.D. in 1987 from Harvard University, where he was supervised by Wilfried Schmid; his thesis was titled Systems of Hodge Bundles and Uniformization. He became a professor at the University of Toulouse III (Paul Sabatier University) and then at the University of Nice. He is research director of the Centre national de la recherche scientifique.

He works on moduli spaces of vector bundles, higher non-abelian de Rham cohomology (Hodge theory), the theory of higher categories and computer verification of mathematical proofs (e.g. verification of proofs within Zermelo–Fraenkel set theory using Rocq). In his Ph.D. dissertation, Simpson studied the notion of system of Hodge bundles, which can be seen as a special case of the higher dimensional generalization of Higgs bundles introduced earlier by Nigel Hitchin. The Simpson correspondence (or the Corlette-Simpson correspondence, named after Kevin Corlette and Simpson) is a correspondence between Higgs bundles and representations of the fundamental group of a smooth, complex algebraic curve.

The Deligne–Simpson Problem, an algebraic problem associated with monodromy matrices, is named after Carlos Simpson and Pierre Deligne.

Simpson was an Invited Speaker with talk Nonabelian Hodge theory at the International Congress of Mathematicians in 1990 at Kyoto. In 2015 he received the Sophie Germain Prize.

== Selected publications ==
- Simpson, Carlos (1988). "Constructing variations of Hodge structure using Yang–Mills theory and applications to uniformization". Journal of the American Mathematical Society. 1 (4): 867–918. doi:10.2307/1990994. JSTOR 1990994. MR 0944577.
- Simpson, Carlos (1990). "Transcendental aspects of the Riemann–Hilbert correspondence". Illinois Journal of Mathematics. 34 (2): 368–391. doi:10.1215/ijm/1255988271. MR 1046569.
- Simpson, Carlos (1990). "Harmonic bundles on noncompact curves". Journal of the American Mathematical Society. 3 (3): 713–770. doi:10.2307/1990935. JSTOR 1990935. MR 1040197.
- Simpson, Carlos (1991). Asymptotic behavior of monodromy: singularly perturbed differential equations on a Riemann surface. Lecture Notes in Mathematics. Vol. 1502. Springer Verlag. ISBN 3-540-55009-7. MR 1166192.
- Simpson, Carlos (1992). "Higgs bundles and local systems". Publications Mathématiques de l'IHÉS. 75: 5–95. doi:10.1007/bf02699491. MR 1179076. S2CID 56417181.
- Simpson, Carlos (1993). "Subspaces of moduli spaces of rank one local systems". Annales Scientifiques de l'École Normale Supérieure. 4. 26 (3): 361–401. doi:10.24033/asens.1675. MR 1222278.
- Simpson, Carlos (1994). "Moduli of representations of the fundamental group of a smooth projective variety. I." Publications Mathématiques de l'IHÉS. 79: 47–129. doi:10.1007/bf02698887. MR 1307297. S2CID 122031663.
- Simpson, Carlos (1994). "Moduli of representations of the fundamental group of a smooth projective variety. II". Publications Mathématiques de l'IHÉS. 80: 5–79. doi:10.1007/bf02698895. MR 1320603. S2CID 189763976.
- Simpson, Carlos (1997), "The Hodge filtration on nonabelian cohomology", Algebraic geometry (Santa Cruz 1995), Proc. Sympos. Pure Math., vol. 62, Part 2, American Mathematical Society, pp. 217–281, arXiv:alg-geom/9604005, doi:10.1090/pspum/062.2/1492538, MR 1492538, S2CID 2659059
- Simpson, Carlos (2012). Homotopy theory of higher categories. New Mathematical Monographs. Vol. 19. Cambridge: Cambridge University Press. ISBN 9781139502191. MR 2883823.
