= Martin Roček =

Theoretical physicist

Martin Roček is an American physicist who is a distinguished professor of theoretical physics at the State University of New York at Stony Brook, and a member of the C. N. Yang Institute for Theoretical Physics. He received A.B. and Ph.D. degrees from Harvard University, supervised for his Ph.D. by Tai Tsun Wu in 1979. He did post-doctoral research at the University of Cambridge and Caltech before becoming a professor at Stony Brook University.

He was one of the co-inventors of hyperkähler quotients, a hyperkahler analogue of Marsden–Weinstein reduction and the structure of Bihermitian manifolds. His research interests include supersymmetry, string theory and applications of generalized complex geometry. With S. J. Gates, M. T. Grisaru, and W. Siegel, Rocek coauthored Superspace, or One thousand and one lessons in supersymmetry (1984), the first comprehensive book on supersymmetry. He has also contributed extensively to supersymmetry and geometry.

He is the local coordinator of the annual Simons Workshop in Mathematics and Physics jointly hosted by Yang Institute for Theoretical Physics and the Department of Mathematics of the Stony Brook University.

In 1991 he received a Guggenheim Fellowship. In 2017 he received a Neuron Prize for lifelong contributions to science. In 2022 he was appointed as a distinguished professor of physics.
