= Hyperkähler quotient =

Mathematics concept

In differential geometry, the hyperkähler quotient of a hyperkähler manifold acted on by a Lie group G is the quotient of a fiber of a hyperkähler moment map $M \to \mathfrak{g} \otimes \mathbb{R}^3$ over a G-fixed point by the action of G. It was introduced by Nigel Hitchin, Anders Karlhede, Ulf Lindström, and Martin Roček in 1987. It is a hyperkähler analogue of the Kähler quotient.
