= ADHM construction =

Method of constructing instanton solutions

In mathematical physics and gauge theory, the ADHM construction or monad construction is the construction of all instantons using methods of linear algebra by Michael Atiyah, Vladimir Drinfeld, Nigel Hitchin, Yuri I. Manin in their paper "Construction of Instantons."

== ADHM data ==
The ADHM construction uses the following data:

- complex vector spaces V and W of dimension k and N,
- k × k complex matrices B_{1}, B_{2}, a k × N complex matrix I and a N × k complex matrix J,
- a real moment map $\mu_r = [B_1,B_1^\dagger]+[B_2,B_2^\dagger]+II^\dagger-J^\dagger J,$
- a complex moment map $\displaystyle\mu_c = [B_1,B_2]+IJ.$

Then the ADHM construction claims that, given certain regularity conditions,

- Given B_{1}, B_{2}, I, J such that $\mu_r=\mu_c=0$, an anti-self-dual instanton in a SU(N) gauge theory with instanton number k can be constructed,
- All anti-self-dual instantons can be obtained in this way and are in one-to-one correspondence with solutions up to a U(k) rotation which acts on each B in the adjoint representation and on I and J via the fundamental and antifundamental representations,
- The metric on the moduli space of instantons is that inherited from the flat metric on B, I and J.

== Generalizations ==
=== Noncommutative instantons ===
In a noncommutative gauge theory, the ADHM construction is identical but the moment map $\vec\mu$ is set equal to the self-dual projection of the noncommutativity matrix of the spacetime times the identity matrix. In this case instantons exist even when the gauge group is U(1). The noncommutative instantons were discovered by Nikita Nekrasov and Albert Schwarz in 1998.

=== Vortices ===
Setting B_{2} and J to zero, one obtains the classical moduli space of nonabelian vortices in a supersymmetric gauge theory with an equal number of colors and flavors, as was demonstrated in Vortices, instantons and branes. The generalization to greater numbers of flavors appeared in Solitons in the Higgs phase: The Moduli matrix approach. In both cases the Fayet–Iliopoulos term, which determines a squark condensate, plays the role of the noncommutativity parameter in the real moment map.

== The construction formula ==
Let x be the 4-dimensional Euclidean spacetime coordinates written in quaternionic notation
$$x_{ij}=\begin{pmatrix}z_2&z_1\\-\bar{z_1}&\bar{z_2}\end{pmatrix}.$$

Consider the 2k × (N + 2k) matrix

$$\Delta= \begin{pmatrix}I&B_2+z_2&B_1+z_1\\J^\dagger&-B_1^\dagger-\bar{z_1}&B_2^\dagger+\bar{z_2}\end{pmatrix}.$$

Then the conditions $\displaystyle\mu_r=\mu_c=0$ are equivalent to the factorization condition

$$\Delta\Delta^\dagger=\begin{pmatrix}f^{-1}&0\\0&f^{-1}\end{pmatrix}$$
where f(x) is a k × k Hermitian matrix.

Then a hermitian projection operator P can be constructed as

$$P=\Delta^\dagger\begin{pmatrix}f&0\\0&f\end{pmatrix}\Delta.$$

The nullspace of Δ(x) is of dimension N for generic x. The basis vectors for this null-space can be assembled into an (N + 2k) × N matrix U(x) with orthonormalization condition U^{†}U = 1.

A regularity condition on the rank of Δ guarantees the completeness condition

$$P+UU^\dagger=1. \,$$

The anti-selfdual connection is then constructed from U by the formula

$$A_m=U^\dagger \partial_m U.$$

== See also ==
- Monad (homological algebra)
- Twistor theory
