= Higgs bundle =

Type of vector bundle

In mathematics, a Higgs bundle is a pair $(E,\varphi)$ consisting of a holomorphic vector bundle E and a Higgs field $\varphi$, a holomorphic 1-form taking values in the bundle of endomorphisms of E such that $\varphi \wedge \varphi=0$. Such pairs were introduced by Nigel Hitchin (1987), who named the field $\varphi$ after Peter Higgs because of an analogy with Higgs bosons. The term 'Higgs bundle', and the condition $\varphi \wedge \varphi=0$ (which is vacuous in Hitchin's original set-up on Riemann surfaces) was introduced later by Carlos Simpson.

A Higgs bundle can be thought of as a "simplified version" of a flat holomorphic connection on a holomorphic vector bundle, where the derivative is scaled to zero. The nonabelian Hodge correspondence says that, under suitable stability conditions, the category of flat holomorphic connections on a smooth projective complex algebraic variety, the category of representations of the fundamental group of the variety, and the category of Higgs bundles over this variety are actually equivalent. Therefore, one can deduce results about gauge theory with flat connections by working with the simpler Higgs bundles.

== History ==
Higgs bundles were first introduced by Hitchin in 1987, for the specific case where the holomorphic vector bundle E is over a compact Riemann surface. Further, Hitchin's paper mostly discusses the case where the vector bundle is rank 2 (that is, the fiber is a 2-dimensional vector space). The rank 2 vector bundle arises as the solution space to Hitchin's equations for a principal SU(2)-bundle.

The theory on Riemann surfaces was generalized by Carlos Simpson to the case where the base manifold is compact and Kähler. Restricting to the dimension one case recovers Hitchin's theory.

== Stability of a Higgs bundle ==
Of particular interest in the theory of Higgs bundles is the notion of a stable Higgs bundle. To do so, $\varphi$-invariant subbundles must first be defined.

In Hitchin's original discussion, a rank-1 subbundle labelled L is $\varphi$-invariant if $\varphi(L) \subset L \otimes K$ with $K$ the canonical bundle over the Riemann surface M. Then a Higgs bundle $(E, \varphi)$ is stable if, for each $\varphi$ invariant subbundle $L$ of $E$,
$$\operatorname{deg} L < \frac{1}{2}\operatorname{deg}(\wedge^2 E),$$
with $\operatorname{deg}$ being the usual notion of degree for a complex vector bundle over a Riemann surface.

== See also ==
- Hitchin system
