= Sentinel program =

Proposed US Army anti-ballistic missile system

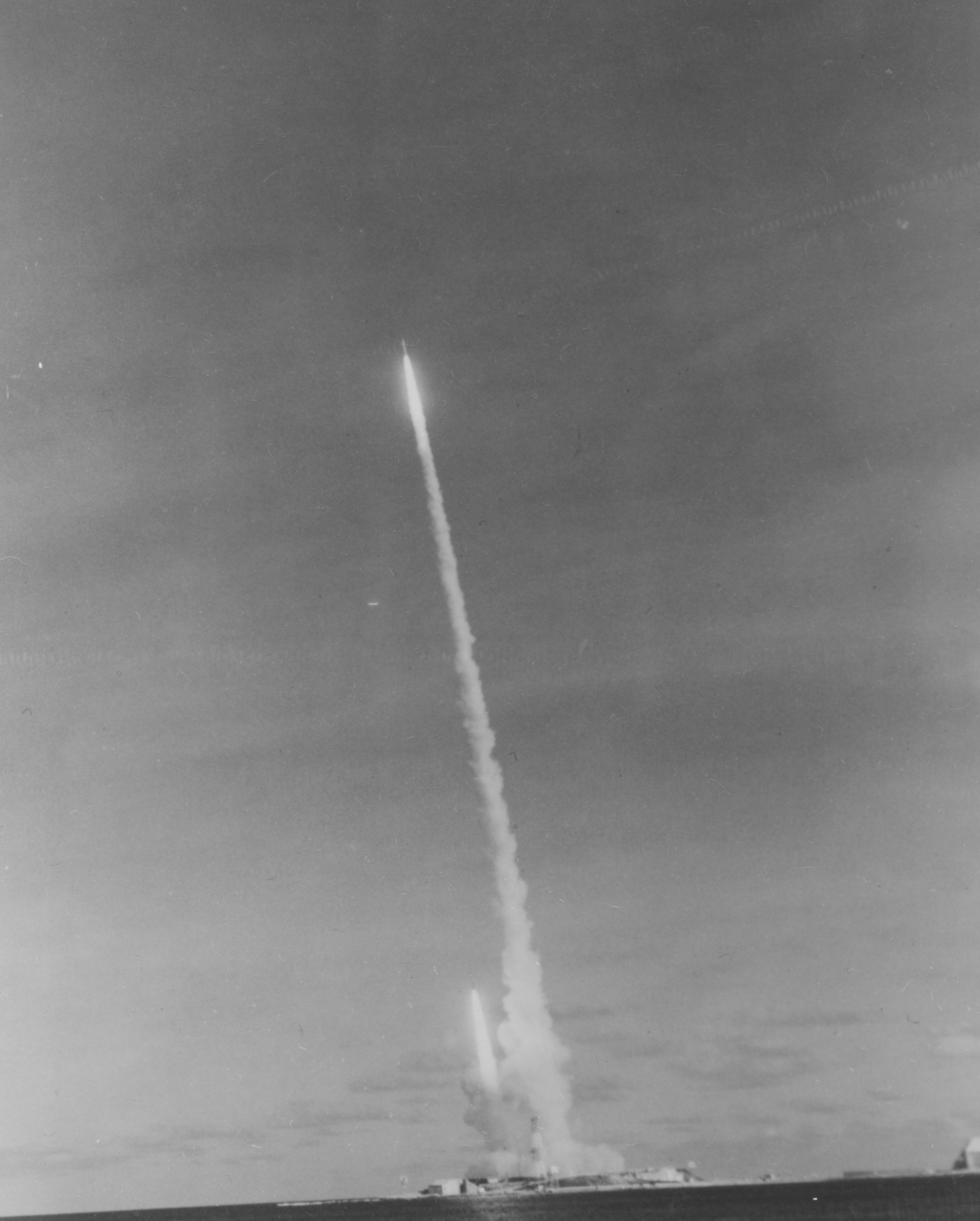
Spartan missiles formed the backbone of the Sentinel system. This dual launch from Meck Island in the South Pacific successfully intercepted a reentry vehicle launched from Vandenberg Air Force Base in California.

Sentinel was a proposed US Army anti-ballistic missile (ABM) system designed to provide a light layer of protection over the entire United States, able to defend against small ICBM strikes like those expected from China, or accidental launches from the USSR or other states. The system would have seventeen bases, each centered on its Missile Site Radar (MSR) and a computerized command center buried below it. The system was supported by a string of five long-range Perimeter Acquisition Radars (PAR) spread across the US/Canada border area and another in Alaska. The primary weapon was the long-range Spartan missile, with short range Sprint missiles providing additional protection near US ICBM fields and PAR sites. The system would initially have a total of 480 Spartan and 192 Sprint missiles.

Sentinel was a response to the rapidly rising costs of the earlier Nike-X concept. Nike-X was designed to handle full-out attacks by the Soviet ICBM force of thousands of missiles, stockpiling more interceptors than the Soviets had ICBMs. As the number of Soviet ICBMs grew, the number of interceptor missiles required to maintain the defense soared. Calculations suggested it would cost twenty times as much to defend against the Soviet missiles as it cost the Soviets to build them. Robert McNamara felt that deploying Nike-X would prompt the Soviets to produce more missiles, and thereby increase the odds of an accidental war.

Although these problems were well known, the Johnson administration was under intense political pressure to deploy an ABM system, especially as the Soviets were known to be building one of their own. McNamara spoke in public several times to explain why Nike-X was not worth deploying, but the pressure continued to build and Congress voted to provide deployment funding over his wishes. When the Chinese detonated their first H-bomb in 1967, McNamara proposed building a limited deployment that would primarily be a system to defend to a limited Chinese attack. This eased the pressure to deploy a larger system, while also keeping costs under control. Sentinel was announced on 18 September 1967, and construction on the first Sentinel base outside Boston started in 1968.

By the time Richard Nixon took office in January 1969, public opinion had swung strongly against ABMs. Residents of the cities to be protected protested that it simply made them targets for more Soviet bombs, and there were a number of well organized public demonstrations against the system. Nixon ordered a review that suggested sweeping changes to the system, and the Sentinel program was cancelled in March 1969 after only 18 months of existence. In its place, an even lighter system intended primarily to defend USAF missile bases was introduced, the Safeguard Program.

== History ==
=== Nike Zeus ===
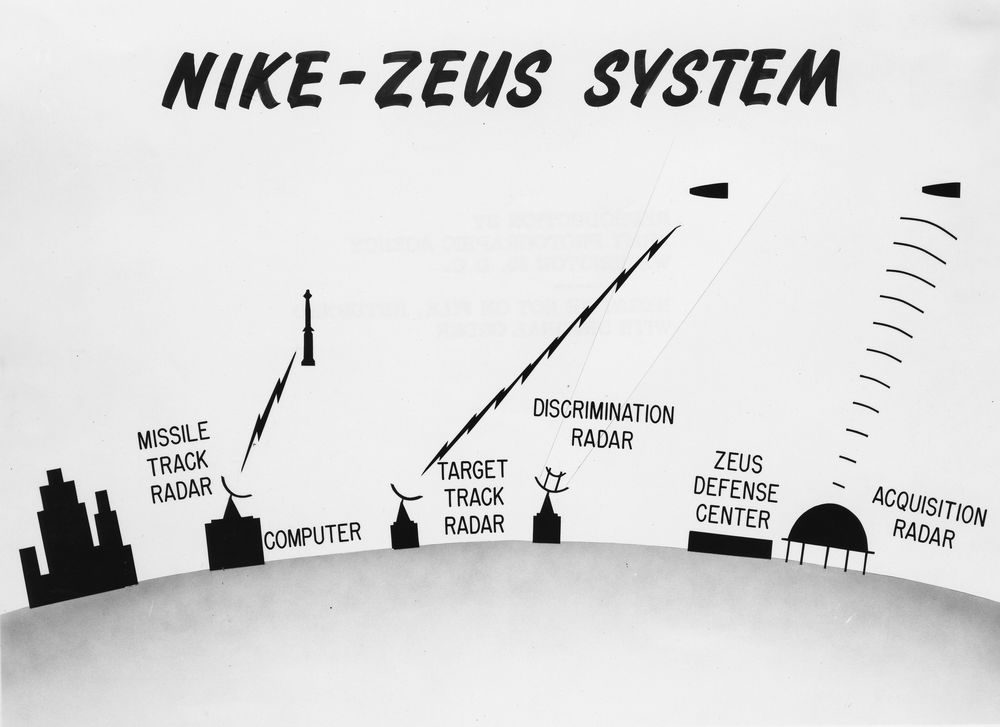
Nike Zeus was based on concepts developed for the Nike Ajax and Nike Hercules anti-aircraft missiles. Its separate radars did not have the capability of dealing with more than a few warheads at a time.

The US Army began ABM research in 1955, after a Bell Labs report concluded that modern computers, radars, and missile systems had improved to the point where attacks on ICBM reentry vehicles (RVs) were a possibility. The task is not trivial; RVs are travelling at about 5 miles (8 km) per second and have a small radar cross section, perhaps only 0.1 square metres (1 sq ft). Bell concluded that the primary issue would be detecting the RVs early enough to leave enough time for the missile to climb to its altitude. The Army began work on a system under the name Nike II, but later changed the name to Nike Zeus.

When Nikita Khrushchev claimed to be building ICBMs "like sausages", the US feared that a missile gap would form. For a period, the Soviets would have enough missiles to attack the USAF's bomber bases, while the US's own missile force was not large enough, by itself, to be an effective deterrent. The Gaither Report suggested that preventing this sort of attack was a top priority, and suggested that Zeus be deployed as quickly as possible to protect the bombers. Zeus development was accelerated in January 1958, and granted the highest national development priority.

By 1961, when John F. Kennedy took office, the system was in the testing phase, and deployment was planned for 1963. By this time, a number of serious technical problems with Zeus had become clear. One was that the Zeus radars had no way to distinguish between the RVs and radar decoys travelling together in an extended threat tube. The Army predicted that as many as twenty Zeus missiles would have to be launched to hit the RV hiding among the decoys. However, Zeus was not actually capable of doing this; Zeus could only track one target per radar, and most sites would have only two to four radars. A salvo of four ICBMs, or a single ICBM with four credible decoys, was almost certain to destroy the Zeus base.

=== Nike-X ===
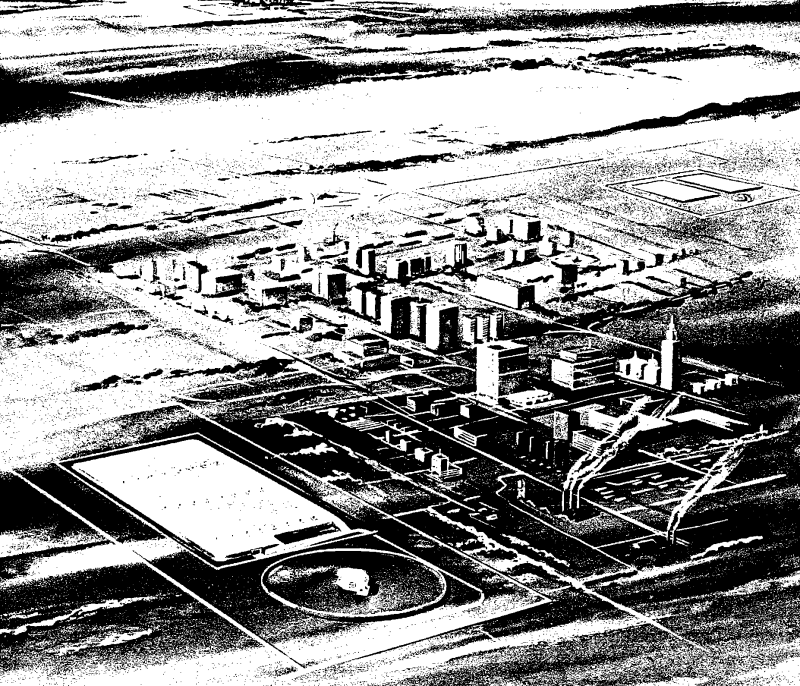
Nike-X would be built close to cities as their Sprint missiles had short range. In this image, two Sprint launch sites protect a small city.

A number of technical reviews from the late 1950s and early 1960s all concluded that Zeus would offer little protection against a large attack. McNamara asked ARPA to study the system, and they outlined a number of potential development paths. McNamara cancelled development of Zeus on 5 January 1963, and announced that the money would be directed to the development of a new concept, Nike-X.

Nike-X addressed Zeus' problems in two ways. The first was to replace Zeus' mechanical radar systems with an active electronically scanned array, which would allow it to track hundreds of targets at once, both the incoming ICBMs as well as the outgoing interceptors. The second dealt with decoys; Nike-X would wait until the RVs began to reenter the lower atmosphere, at which point the lighter decoys would quickly slow down and reveal the RV hiding among them. A very high-speed missile would then attack them in the few seconds between this decluttering and the enemy warhead triggering, at altitudes as low as 20,000 feet (6.1 km).

By 1965 the Nike-X system was itself well into its testing phase when the cost of implementing any sort of reasonable protection became a serious problem. The baseline system required 7,000 Sprint missiles and would cost $40 billion ($421 billion in 2025, about ½ the annual military budget). Yet even with this system, as much as 30% of the US population was expected to die in a full exchange. McNamara noted that protecting 70% of the population could also be achieved by building fallout shelters, and this would cost far less than Nike-X. He refused to deploy unless funds were also provided for shelters.

Another major problem for Nike-X was the Soviet's own ABM system. The Soviet system was generally similar to Zeus, so the Air Force responded by adding MIRV warheads to their Minuteman missiles to overwhelm it. The Air Force noted that the Soviets could do the same to Nike-X; it cost much more to defend against additional Soviet warheads than build the warheads. McNamara feared that deploying any ABM would lead to another arms race, one that would increase the odds of an accidental war. (Note: In the 1980s, this basic concept was clarified in the Nitze criteria.)

=== New concept ===
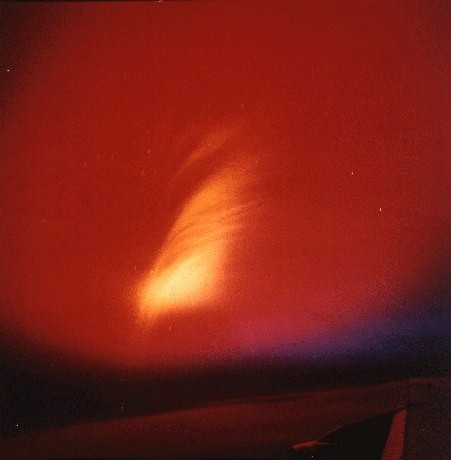
The Starfish Prime nuclear test created a huge area of ionized air that was opaque to radar until it cooled.

In 1962 the US carried out a series of high-altitude nuclear tests, notably Starfish Prime, which demonstrated that the burst of x-rays released by a warhead can travel long distances. In the lower atmosphere they travel only a few meters before interacting with the air, which is one of the major mechanisms creating the fireball that forms around the explosion. (Note: See nuclear weapon yield for a discussion of the various fireball mechanisms.) In space, their mean free path was on the order of tens of kilometers. When the x-rays strike solid material they cause it to heat so rapidly that shock waves form. These can be powerful enough to break up an RV's heat shield or cause it to separate from the airframe. In March 1965, Bell was given the go-ahead to develop a new Zeus design based on this concept, and entered detailed planning in October.

The original Zeus had to maneuver within about 800 feet (240 m) for its neutron heating mechanism to safely guarantee the enemy warhead would be disabled. Due to the limitations of the angular resolution of the radars, this limited the range of the engagement to about 75 miles (121 km), although the missile itself was capable of much greater range, as much as 200 miles (320 km).

With the new warhead concept, the lethal range was greatly extended, potentially as great as several kilometers. Since the threat tube of the RV and decoys was perhaps a kilometer across, that meant that a single missile could kill the warhead even if it was completely surrounded by decoys and chaff, although more than one might be needed to cover the length of the tube. And since the required accuracy was reduced by an order of magnitude, the radars could provide the guidance over a much greater range, potentially out to the radar horizon.

In keeping with the desire to develop the new design as rapidly as possible, Zeus EX was designed to provide about 450 miles (720 km) range, about the limit that could be provided by adapting the existing Zeus design. Much of the extra range was accomplished with slight improvements in the fuels, slightly larger motors, and different flight paths that flew out of the atmosphere earlier to reduce drag. Additional range was provided by using the third stage motors, originally intended for last-second maneuvering, as an additional booster. With the accuracy requirements lowered, these last second adjustments were no longer needed.

=== Smaller systems ===
Throughout the development of the Nike-X system, the Army, Air Force and ARPA repeatedly examined smaller deployments with more limited goals.

One concept, initially proposed by ARPA as Hardpoint, was a small Nike-X system placed close to USAF missile bases. The idea was to protect them from any sort of limited attack; the Soviets could overwhelm the system, but only by using up a large portion of their forces. The Air Force and Army were initially interested and collaborated on follow-up studies under the name Hardsite. Over time the Air Force soured on the idea of giving the Army any strategic role, and proposed that the funding instead be used to build missile silos in hard rock, which would have the same effect in terms of protecting the missiles but for far less money.

Another problem that arose was that Nike-X ignored the defence of smaller cities, whose politicians then complained that they would become prime targets for the Soviets. ARPA responded by introducing the Small City Defense concept (SCD). Unlike Nike-X, the SCD radars did not have the ability to detect the warheads at long range, so some other early warning system would be needed. This led to the development of the low-cost Perimeter Acquisition Radar (PAR), whose function was to measure the threat tubes while they were still minutes away, determine their targets, and warn the appropriate SCDs.

In February 1965 the Army asked Bell to consider a very light version of Nike-X intended to provide protection only under the limited attacks by smaller nuclear-armed countries, the so-called Nth Country concept. Bell combined the radars and computers from the SCD concept with Zeus EX, which pushed the engagement range out to hundreds of miles. This allowed a single base to provide coverage over multi-state areas, although it lost the advantages of Sprint in terms of nuclear blackout avoidance. For a system limited to the most basic attacks, the new design could provide all-country defense for a reasonable cost.

=== Continued debate on Nike-X ===
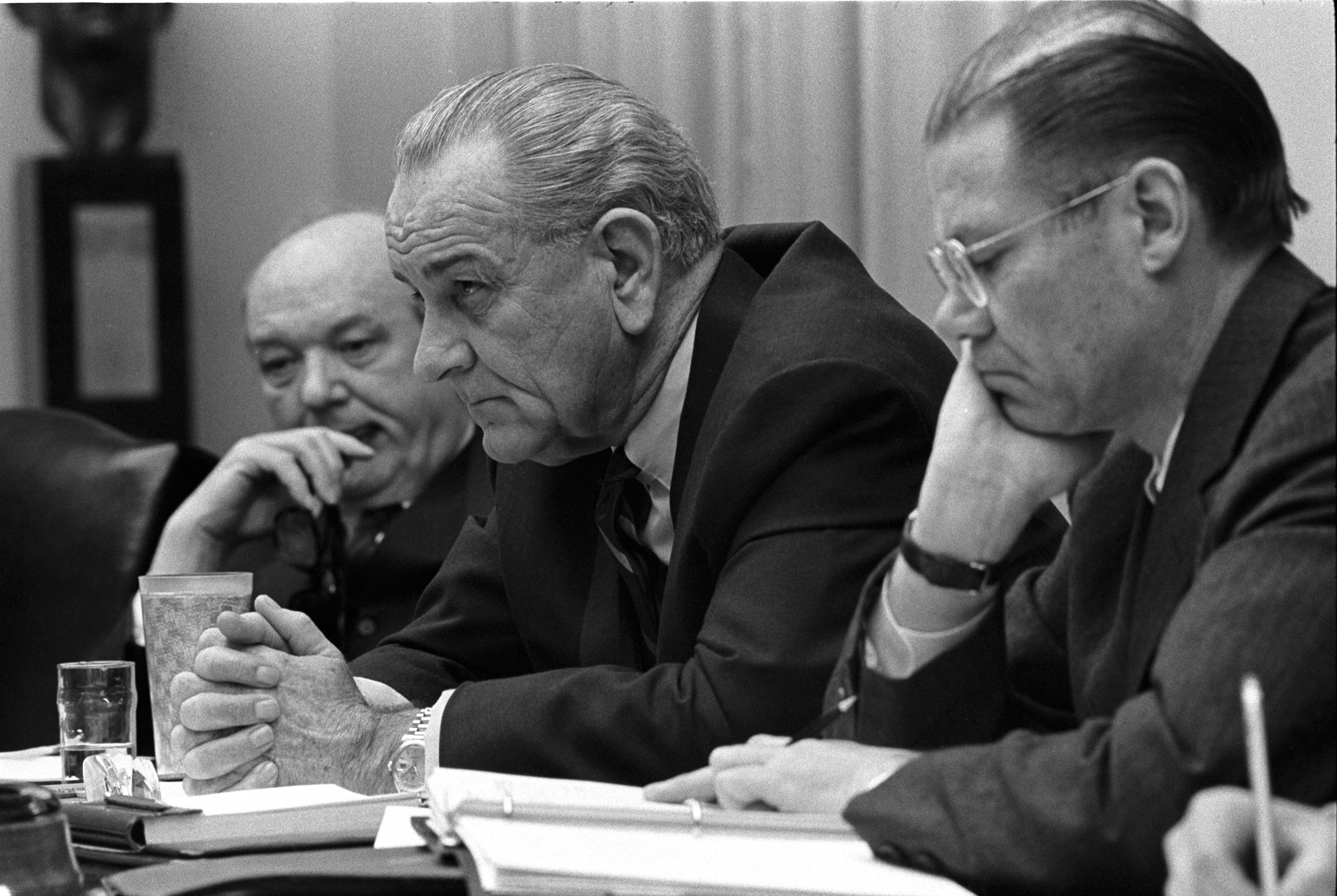
Rusk, Johnson and McNamara developed the plan that led to the ABM Treaty in 1972.

By 1966 ABM development in the US had been a high priority project for a decade, and had constantly found itself at the disadvantage compared to improving ICBMs. In spite of its tremendous technical advances, Nike-X was no more able to protect the US population than the Zeus had been in the 1950s. These problems were widely known, but there was intense political pressure to deploy a system anyway. McNamara had opposed deployment throughout. Things came to a head in 1966, when McNamara once again refused to begin construction but the Senate Armed Services Committee provided $167.9 million ($1666 million today) anyway.

McNamara and President Johnson met on the issue on 3 November 1966, and McNamara once again convinced Johnson that the system simply wasn't worth deploying. A follow-up meeting the next month initially appeared to be leading to a deployment being forced upon them, but McNamara managed to convince the president, Joint Chiefs of Staff, and others that the system simply didn't work. Instead, he suggested to the president that they open negotiations with the Soviets on arms limitations. The President asked Dean Rusk to begin negotiations.

McNamara then headed off the expected counterattack from George W. Romney by calling a press conference on the topic of Soviet ABMs and stating that the new Minuteman III and Poseidon SLBM would ensure that any possible Soviet system would be overwhelmed, and went on to state that ABMs were generally not very useful given their cost. This did not deflect the continued stream of criticism over the US's lack of an ABM system, especially as the Soviets continued to build their own.

=== Arms limitations talks ===
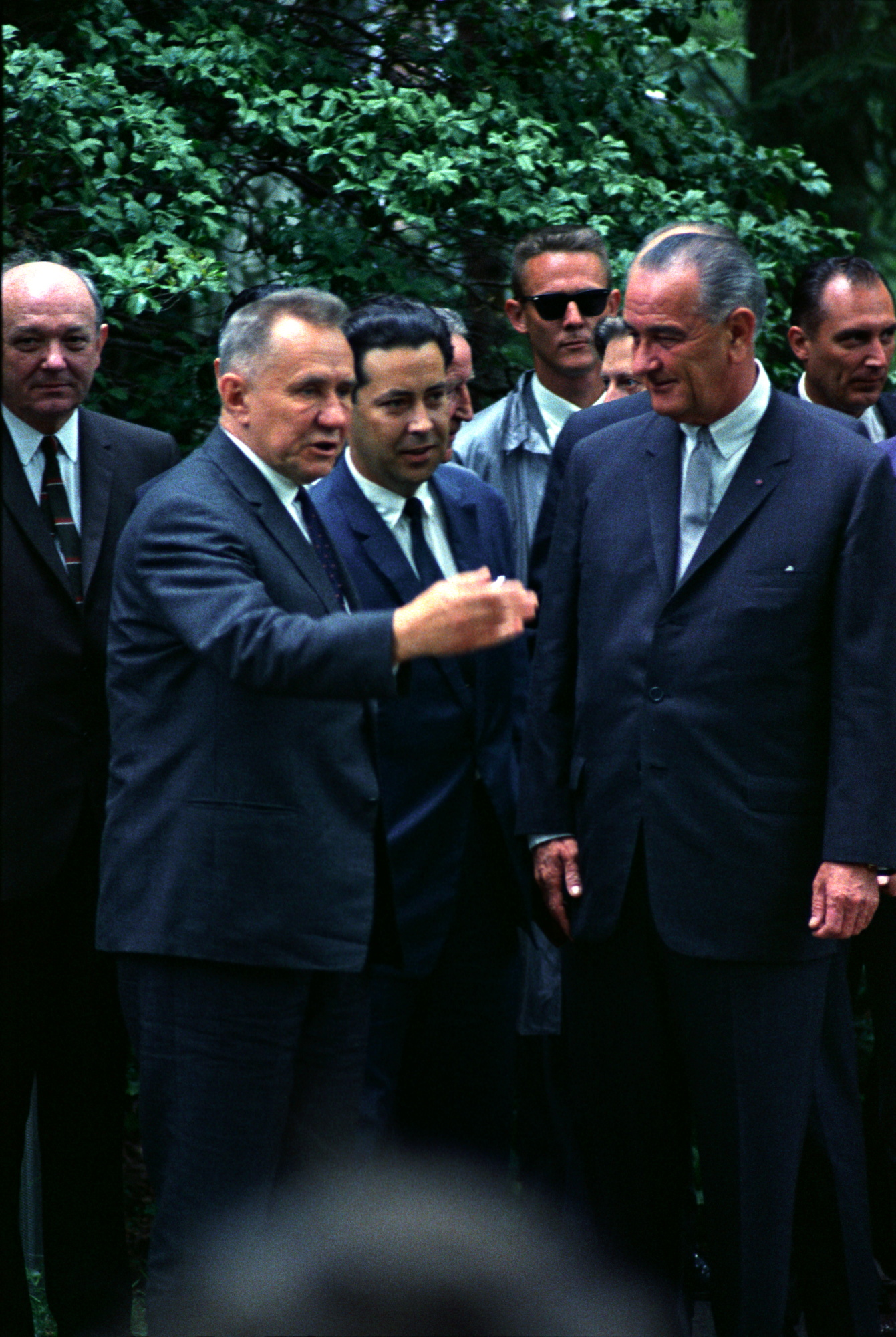
Soviet Premier Alexei Kosygin met with Johnson at the Glassboro Summit Conference.

During his January 1967 budget speech, Johnson stated that he was willing to "take no action now" on an ABM system if the Soviets were willing to discuss ABM limitations. In March 1967 Johnson wrote to the Soviet leadership proposing formal talks. Premier Alexei Kosygin wrote back and stated that he was willing to meet on the issue. McNamara and the two leaders met at the Glassboro Summit in Glassboro, New Jersey in June 1967.

McNamara opened by stating the obvious, that the arms race in ICBMs had resulted in both countries going "beyond all reason", a position Kosygin readily agreed with. He then continued that he was worried about the same happening with defensive weapons, but on this point Kosygin disagreed, quoting a speech McNamara had made about the cost-exchange ratio, and suggesting that basing your military policy on such a concept was morally bankrupt. McNamara's own version of the story is somewhat more colorful:

He absolutely exploded. The blood rose to his face, his veins swelled, he pounded the table and he said - he could barely talk he was so emotional - he said "Defense is moral, offense is immoral!"

Others who also saw the exchange, including Walt Rostrow, suggested that McNamara's telling of the story is "a lot of nonsense" and recalls it only coming up when Kosygin proposed a toast to the effect that "only defense is good". Another observer states the discussion was more level headed, quoting Kosygin:

Which weapons should be regarded as a tension factor offensive or defensive weapons? I think that a defensive system, which prevents attack, is not a cause of the arms race but represents a factor preventing the death of people. Some persons reason thus: Which is cheaper, to have offensive weapons that can destroy cities and entire states or to have weapons that can prevent this destruction? ... An antimissile system may cost more than an offensive one, but it is intended not for killing people but for saving human lives.

The Soviets also tell stories about McNamara's behavior at the meeting; Boris Sedov later told Ray Garthoff that McNamara had launched into an hour long talk about strategic theory complete with slides and math, and that when both Johnson and Kosygin wanted to break for lunch, McNamara "put his hands on the shoulders of both Kosygin and the president, almost literally holding them down."

In any event, the two apparently failed to convince Kosygin that ABMs were a proliferation problem, and by the summer it was clear that the Soviets were not progressing on the deal. On 8 September 1967, Dean Rusk sent the Soviets a note suggesting they reengage, or the US would begin to deploy an ABM system. When an answer was not received within 8 days, the process was considered to be stalled. With the continued Congressional pressure to deploy and the political liability of not having a system while the Soviets did, the issue would clearly be a major one during the upcoming elections. By the fall Johnson and McNamara had decided that some sort of deployment would have to take place.

=== Sentinel ===
In keeping with the theme of previous Nike projects, Sentinel introduced this new emblem featuring a Roman soldier.

On 17 June 1967 the Chinese detonated their first hydrogen bomb as part of Test No. 6. McNamara saw this as a solution to the problem of deploying an ABM; the Nth Country system would provide a credible defense against a Chinese attack well into the 1970s while still being a relatively inexpensive system that would blunt further calls for a larger ABM deployment.

On 18 September 1967, (Note: Some sources say 8 September, but this appears to refer to the decision, not the announcement.) while visiting San Francisco, McNamara announced that the US would begin deploying of a "Chinese oriented" system. After a long speech explaining the difficulty in building a "thick" system against the Soviets, he introduced the "thin" system this way:

Further, the Chinese oriented ABM system would enable us to add as a concurrent benefit, a defense of our Minuteman system. And this at a modest cost. And finally, such an ABM system would provide protection against accidental launch... by any nation possessing nuclear weapons. Such accidental launches are highly improbable, but they're not inconceivable. After a detailed review then of all of these considerations, we've decided to go forward with this Chinese oriented ABM system.

Following the Nth Country concept, Sentinel called for seventeen sites, fifteen in the continental US, and one each in Alaska and Hawaii. Each base would consist of a MSR with one or more faces depending on where the threats might approach from, a main missile battery with Spartan, and one or more optional remote bases with Sprint missiles. Five of the bases located near the Canada–US border would also host a PAR radar, as well as one in Fairbanks, Alaska. The base in Hawaii, open to attack from any angle and with nowhere to effectively site a PAR, was equipped only with Sprint.

On 3 November 1967, the first ten locations were announced, with Boston being the first on the list. In April 1968 the Sentinel production contract was signed, the first production contract for a US ABM system. At the time, the cost for the system was estimated to be $4 to $6 billion ($39 to $58 billion in 2025) and as much as $20-$60 billion if the system was to be expanded to deal with any sort of Soviet threat as well.

=== Initial reaction ===
Outside the United States, reaction to Sentinel was universally hostile. The Communist powers in Europe were against the system, deriding it as another example of imperialist warmongering. But allied powers also proved to have serious concerns. Canada, which stood to benefit from the protection offered by the bases around northern US cities, refused to have anything to do with it in spite of it being part of NORAD. The UK was upset about not having been consulted, especially as they had been working behind the scenes for some time to bring the US and USSR together for arms limitations talks.

Inside the US, the reaction was mixed. Within political circles, support was split, even across party lines, with Senators Stennis, Anderson, Tower, and Hickenlooper being notably in favor, while Church, Clark, and Fulbright were opposed. By this time, the Vietnam War had been going on for some time, and a series of larger battles such as the Tet Offensive were wearing on public opinion. Military matters of all kinds were becoming issues of public debate, and the populace was increasingly reacting against further military spending of any sort.

One issue that became serious was the matter of site locations. Nike-X's Sprint missiles were so short ranged that several bases had to be built to cover the area of a large city. Sentinel relied mostly on the long range Spartan, so the missile sites could have been located at considerable distance from the cities. Public statements suggested that this would be the case; Sidney Yates noted in a 13 January 1969 meeting in Chicago that "The Department of Defence today identified the first ten geographical areas to be surveyed as possible site locations for the Sentinel system..." with the term "geographical areas" being taken to mean large areas. But for reasons that are not entirely clear, Pentagon officials instead picked locations within the suburban area. It is debated among sources if this was done out of simple laziness by reusing previously surveyed Nike-X locations, or if the Army was selecting locations that could later host Sprint if the system was upgraded.

This misguided decision would ultimately prove fatal; they simply didn't consider "good old American feelings about real estate" when presented with the fact that nuclear missiles would be placed in their neighbourhoods. Johnson and McNamara stated that an expansion to a heavy system was impossible, thereby offering no reason why the bases were located near cities. The Army's lack of an answer on this issue led to considerable suspicion, which Senator Richard Russell summed up as believing the system was "...the foundation stone of a missile defense system to protect us against missiles of the Soviet Union". (Note: Sentinel's TACMSRs were significantly less advanced than Nike-X's MAR, with limited ability to generate the multiple beams needed for rapid discrimination that MAR provided. This was inherent to their design – they would have to be replaced outright if they would be asked to deal with anything more than a few dozen warheads in total. While PAR had some capability in this regard, its long range design, distant siting and one directional facing limited its ability to gather information during the terminal phase when Sprint would require this information.) Lieutenant General Alfred Dodd Starbird further confused matters by explaining that the $5.5 billion earmarked for Sentinel would only protect against China through the 1970s, and he expected further expansions to be required in the future.

Congress adjourned in October for the 1968 presidential elections, and the ABM system became a political issue during the campaign. Nixon had been stating for some time that the Democrats had been deliberately dragging their feet on the ABM issue, which, during the early campaign, had been non-contentious. But by the time the elections had concluded in November, local opposition groups had grown in size and popularity, and formed in almost all of the cities hosting the bases.

=== Local hostility ===
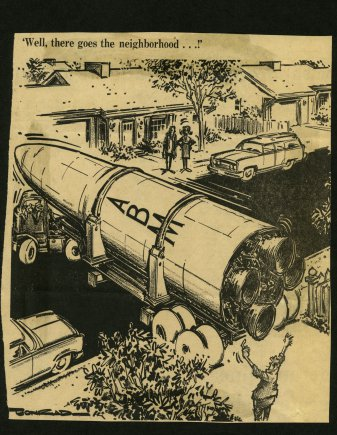
The New York Times satirized Sentinel by showing one of the missiles being backed up into a suburban home's yard and describing it using the catchphrase of contemporary fears over racial integration.

Site selection for Boston was carried out in early 1968, and after considering a number of locations the Army Corps of Engineers selected the National Guard's Camp Curtis Guild about 12 miles (19 km) north of downtown Boston for the MSR and missile silos, and Sharpner's Pond, about 6 miles (9.7 km) further north, for the PAR. Excavation began in the fall, by which time advanced site selection was underway in Chicago and Seattle.

In the fall of 1968, scientists at Argonne National Laboratory outside Chicago alerted the press about the arrival of Sentinel, and explained the controversy surrounding the system. Led by John Erskine and David Inglis, and styling themselves as the West Suburban Concerned Scientists, they kept the issue in the news through the fall and winter. A number of politicians and citizens groups called for public meetings on the topic, but the Department of Defense instead held a closed-door meeting for local politicians. At the time the public reaction was fairly mute. When the Corps of Engineers began test drilling at five potential sites around Chicago in November, the issue blew up in the press, and by December local polls were showing the public was firmly opposed to the system.

Similar groups sprang up in other cities selected to host Sentinel. In Seattle, University of Washington graduate student Newell Mack organized a student led citizen's group, and a similar organization formed in Detroit led by physicist Alvin Saperstein. The Federation of American Scientists became an informational hub on the issue, publishing a number of position papers. This coincided with a series of public releases by a number of well respected scientists who outlined the problems with the ABM concept as a whole, and pointed out the destabilizing effects such a system might have on the balance of power. Of particular note were three major articles in Scientific American covering the topic in considerable depth.

The rapid change in public opinion through the late 1968 and early 1969 period can be best seen by comparing two meetings held by the Army in the Boston area. The first, held on 25 September 1968 at North Andover, received a small amount of newspaper coverage and was attended by about 100 citizens. A "climate assessment" made prior to the meeting found no organized opposition. But as the issue became more public, the nearby Lynnfield Village Board received calls from a full 15% of the local population asking for the site to be moved. They expressed their concern that the missile base would lower property values, and that accidents meant "Lynnfield could be wiped off the map in the blink of an eyelash." The Army's response was to promise they would do their best to minimize the radar's interference with television signals.

The Army announced a second meeting, to be held on 29 January 1969 at Reading. In the days prior it appeared to be turning into a potentially worrying situation, with the local police estimating that as many as 5,000 people might show up, a significant portion of the local population. A blizzard stopped many, but between 1,100 and 1,800 people attended, overflowing the auditorium and spilling over into the cafeteria. The crowd was "unsettled, dubious and outspoken", and interrupted the presentations on several occasions with a "series of shout-downs, prolonged applause, and cat-calls aimed at the presenters."

The meeting received nationwide coverage in the news, and the next day The Boston Globe reported that 500 members of the audience stayed on after the meeting to coordinate local opposition. Commenting on the Reading meeting, a DOD official wrote a memo to the Assistant Secretary of Defense for Research and Engineering, John S. Foster, Jr., stating that he found the crowd to be "extremely well informed" and expressed his opinion that if this reaction was typical, "there is a very good chance that the Congress would have to act to cancel the system".

=== Sentinel becomes Safeguard ===
Three former presidential advisors on the ABM topic were attendees of the Reading meeting: George Rathjens, Jerome Wiesner, and Richard N. Goodwin. Immediately after the meeting, they wrote to Senator Edward Kennedy, urging him to take up the issue. Kennedy wrote to Nixon's new Secretary of Defense, Melvin Laird, challenging the program. Kennedy's letter sparked off a huge debate on the topic in Congress on 4 February.

Laird initially ignored the issue, but opposition in Congress quickly grew, along with plans to cancel funding for land purchases for the program. Bowing to the opposition, on 6 February 1969 Laird agreed to review the program, and stopped construction at Sharpner's Pond in the meantime. The review lasted five weeks, and the results were announced by President Nixon at a press conference on 14 March. The Sentinel deployment would be modified with a new emphasis on protection of the US's Minuteman missile fields.

Echoing the almost continuous refrain of the Johnson administration for the past six years, Nixon noted that:

When you are looking toward city defense, it needs to be a perfect or near perfect system because, as I examined the possibility of even a thick defense of cities, I have found that even the most optimistic projections, considering the highest development of the art, would mean that we would still lose 30 million to 40 million lives...

Instead, the new system was intended to be:

...a safeguard against any attack by the Chinese Communists that we can foresee over the next 10 years. It is a safeguard of our deterrent system, which is increasingly vulnerable due to the advances that have been made by the Soviet Union since the year 1967 when the Sentinel program was first laid out. It is a safeguard also against any irrational or accidental attack that might occur of less than the massive magnitude which might be launched from the Soviet Union.

Standing in front of a large map titled "Modified SENTINEL", Deputy Defense Secretary David Packard described the changes to the system. The new arrangement would still provide nationwide coverage against light attacks, but the bases were positioned well outside of major cities, and its primary purpose, at least initially, was to protect the US missile fields. In response to the new threat of Fractional Orbital Bombardment System (FOBS) and improved SLBMs, the PARs would be rearranged to provide coverage over the south as well. Unlike Sentinel, the new system would be built in stages, starting with the main Minuteman missile fields in the Midwest.

Following Nixon's example, when the system was announced by the press, they began referring to it as Safeguard, and the Army officially changed the name on 25 March.

== Testing ==
As part of the Nike Zeus program, the Army had built a complete Zeus battery on Kwajalein Island, and constructed a wide array of tracking instruments on Kwajalein and the other islands of the atoll. Renamed as the Kwajalein Missile Range (KMR), this was an obvious location for Nike-X testing, but the Zeus base took up almost all of the available land on Kwajalein. To address this problem, a large extension was built on the westward end of the island, where the prototype MAR-II was under construction when Nike-X was cancelled. The MSR and launchers were placed on Meck Island, about 20 miles (32 km) north.

Construction of the launch site on Meck began in late 1967. As the island is only a few feet over sea level, it was decided not to build the MSR in the form it would have in a deployment system, where the computers and operations would be underground. Instead, the majority of the system was built above ground in a single-floor rectangular building. The MSR was built in a boxy extension on the north-western corner of the roof, with two sides angled back to form a half-pyramid shape where the antennas were mounted. Small clutter fences were built to the north and northwest; the western side faced out over the water which was only a few tens of meters from the building.

Under the original Nike-X plans, the Sprint missiles would be placed in several bases spread around the area to be defended. This not only provided redundancy in the case of a direct attack, but also placed the missiles closer to their targets, an important consideration given the relatively short ranges and very short reaction times. To test this concept, a second launch site was built on Illeginni Island, 17.5 miles (28.2 km) northwest of Meck, with two Sprint and two Spartan launchers. Illeginni did not have a radar, it was operated remotely from Meck.

Sprint missiles began testing at White Sands Missile Range on 17 November 1965, using the Zeus radars for tracking and guidance. Eventually a total of 42 flights would be carried out at White Sands between 1965 and 1970. Testing then moved to Kwajalein, but by this time Sentinel had already given way to Safeguard. The Zeus EX missiles were developed versions of the early Nike Zeus weapon and were simpler to develop. These were renamed Spartan in January 1967 and began testing at Meck in April 1970, again as part of Safeguard.

Although Sentinel was ultimately cancelled, the testing phase revealed a key issue that would prove to be invaluable during the following Safeguard development. The issue was related to the problems encountered when formerly separate developments were brought together and proved not to work. This was especially true for the software systems, which seriously delayed the program on several occasions. This led to a number of changes for the Safeguard program to address these concerns.

== Description ==
=== System overview ===
In the Nike-X system, each missile site would be based around an extremely powerful radar system known as MAR. MAR could detect incoming tracks at very long distances and used sophisticated beam shaping and data processing intended to allow it to rapidly discriminate targets. MAR also tracked the outgoing Sprint missiles and sent commands to them to aim them at their targets. Because the MAR would be defending a large metropolitan area, and the Sprint had a range of only tens of miles, the missiles would be hosted at a number of locations spread about the city. This left the problem that the MAR would not be able to see the Sprints immediately after launch, so a much smaller and simpler radar, the MSR, would be located at these bases watch the missile for the first few seconds and then hand off to the MAR as the Sprint climbed.

As Nike-X developed there was pressure to deploy systems covering smaller cities, but MAR was far too expensive to produce in the large numbers this demanded. A cut-down version of MAR was initially considered, TACMAR, but later replaced by a scaled-up version of the MSR, the TACMSR. The problem with using MSR was that it had relatively short range, and increasing its power to handle the entire interception, like MAR, would bring its price back up. Instead, Bell proposed using a second radar dedicated to the early detection role, PAR, which would forward information to the TACMSRs so they would know where to look when the warheads became visible. Under Nike-X, the PARs would be disposable; by the time they could be attacked the raid would be well understood and the MARs and TACMSRs would be in control of the battle.

Sentinel was essentially the TACMSR and PAR parts from the Nike-X system, but their purpose was changed dramatically. TACMSR, from then on known simply as MSR, filled the role of a short-range MAR. It was nowhere near powerful enough to handle early detection, and would be useless without PAR. This meant that PAR was no longer disposable in the Sentinel system; if it was destroyed, warheads approaching in its area would appear on the MSRs too late to be intercepted by the Spartan missiles. This required PAR to be hardened against nuclear attack, and moved so it would be protected by a nearby MSR. Sprint missiles would be added to any site hosting a PAR, to help ensure the PAR would survive.

Sentinel was expected to be able to completely break up any Chinese attack through the 1970s, and blunt any limited attack from the USSR. The system as a whole contained the PAR radars and their associated PAR Data Processors (PARDP), the MSR radars and their MSR Data Processors (MSRDP), and a total of 480 Spartan and 192 Sprint missiles. It also contained the capability to provide additional protection of the Minuteman fields, if desired, with future expansions. These would allow the addition of a further 208 Sprint missiles with minor modification of the nearby bases.

=== Bases ===
Sentinel provided coverage over the entire US. Click for a larger view.

There were a total of seventeen bases in the Sentinel deployment. Most of these were near cities: Fairbanks, Honolulu, Seattle, San Francisco, Los Angeles, Salt Lake City, Dallas, Chicago, Detroit, Boston, New York, Washington DC, and Albany, Georgia. In addition, four bases in the Midwest were positioned primarily to protect the US missile fields, at Malmstrom, Grand Forks, Warren, and Whiteman Air Force Bases.

Each site was based around its MSR and housed the Missile Site Data Processor below it, together forming the Missile Site Control Building. Depending on their location, the MSRs would be equipped to look in several directions. For instance, the MSR in Los Angeles was designed to look north only, while the one in Seattle looked north and west. Those located near US missile fields looked in all four directions, as they were expected to come under attack by both ICBMs and SLBMs, which could come from any direction. Hawaii was in a similar situation, as there was no obvious direction that the attack would come from.

Although the primary weapon in the Sentinel system was Spartan, any base near a PAR or missile field also hosted Sprint. The Hawaii base was the exception; lacking a PAR, the long-range Spartan would not have enough warning time to be fired, so this site was based solely on Sprint. Spartan-based sites offered protection over a very large area; the "footprint" of the Whiteman base, roughly centered in the continental US, covered the area from just south of Chicago to the Gulf of Mexico, and from the middle of Illinois in the east to the Texas panhandle in the west. The limited northward extent was primarily due to the detection range of the PARs not leaving enough time to intercept warheads attacking northern targets.

=== Command and control ===
The overall battle was controlled by the Ballistic Missile Defense Center (BMDC), who coordinated control with three Area Control Centers (ACCs) at Detroit (ACC 1), Warren AFB (ACC 2) and Seattle (ACC 3). Each ACC was in direct control of four to six Missile Direction Centers (MDCs), located under each of the MSR radars. Each ACC was located in its own MDC, and a second MCD within its area was assigned as its backup. In the case of the failure or destruction of the primary ACC, a second set of lines to the backup site would activate. While only the ACC and backup had links to the BMDC, all of the sites within the ACC's area were networked to each other to pass voice and data, using two geographically separate sets of private lines.

Spartan interceptions were under control of the ACC. Data from the PARs in its area was forwarded to the ACC, where tracking information was developed over a period of several seconds. The most appropriate launch site within the network was then selected, and launch commands sent to that MDC. The MDC then tracked the Spartan on its MSR while the ACC sent updated information from the PAR. In some cases the MSR would also be used to develop tracking information on the targets, especially in the last stages of the interception where it would be used to reduce the miss distance. For Sprint operations, the ACC's PAR data was used to cue the MSR onto the target, and the MSC would then complete the interception on its own.

=== Radars ===
==== Missile Site Radar, MSR ====
For Nike-X, Bell ran a number of studies to identify the sweet spot for the MSR that would allow it to have enough functionality to be useful at different stages of the attack, as well as being inexpensive enough to justify its existence in a system dominated by MAR. This led to an initial proposal for an S band system using passive scanning (PESA) that was sent out in October 1963. Of the seven proposals received, Raytheon won the development contract in December 1963, with Varian providing the high-power klystrons (twystrons) for the transmitter. An initial prototype design was developed between January and May 1964.

When used with MAR, the MSR needed only short range, enough to hand off the Sprint missiles. This led to a design with limited radiated power. For Small City Defense and I-67, this would not offer enough power to acquire the warheads at reasonable range, and these requirements were further increased when the MSR was tasked with tracking the long range Spartan. This led to an upgraded design with five times the transmitter power, which was sent to Raytheon in May 1965. A further upgrade in May 1966 included the battle control computers and other features of the TACMSR system.

Each MSR was built into a truncated four-sided pyramid, with the sides inclined at 51.5 degrees. In the center of each of the four faces was a circular pattern of holes drilled through the concrete surface passing into a central cavity behind. Phase shift modules were inserted into the holes and wired to power supply and computer controls. At the other side of the cavity was a very high-power transmitter and receiver. The basic concept, sometimes known as a staring array, allows the otherwise relatively multi-directional transmitters and receivers be focused into a narrow beam by applying different delays at each of the exit points from the face of the radar. In the case of the MSR, a single power supply and receiver system was connected in series to each of the active faces.

The advantage to this design, compared to the active electronically scanned array (AESA) MAR, was twofold. One was that it was far cheaper to build, as the only component built on a large scale were the phase shifters, which were relatively inexpensive compared to the active modules of the MAR. (Note: Each MAR module contained well over an ounce of gold, among other expensive components.) The other was that it dramatically reduced the wiring complexity as the shifters were wired in vertical rows instead of individually. The downside was that the system could no longer produce multiple beams, which is the capability that allowed the MAR to handle multiple functions of tracking and discrimination. In comparison, the MSR was really useful only for short-range tracking.

==== Perimeter Acquisition Radar, PAR ====
PAR was initially designed as a low-cost long-range system that would be used in the Small City Defense in order to allow the TACMSR sites to have enough warning time to lock its radar onto the targets. The MARs would also be able to provide this sort of data, but the PAR would both increase the range (and thus the warning time) as well as offload the MARs to allow them to spend more time on their own targets. The PAR was used only in the earliest stages of the attack and was left unhardened to lower costs. The initial study started in October 1965, and several proposals were received in 1966, leading to the selection of General Electric (GE) in December 1966.

As part of the January 1967 I-67 studies that led to Sentinel, MAR was removed, leaving PAR much more critical to the success of the system. This meant the PAR buildings had to be hardened against attack and the effects of electromagnetic pulse (EMP). GE began working on the new design and submitted their Phase I initial results in April. However, the follow-on Phase II design effort was then paused while the team re-evaluated the entire concept in light of studies carried out by the Institute for Defense Analyses (IDA) the previous summer.

Considering the effects of nuclear blackout, the IDA noticed that the effect is strongly related to frequency; in the VHF band, the effect lasts for several minutes, while in the microwave region it clears in a few tens of seconds. However, the VHF band had been selected specifically to lower the cost of building transmitters of the required power, and moving to the microwave band would be extremely expensive. Instead, they moved to the UHF band to try to keep the costs under control. Using lessons learned on Nike-X's MAR, a UHF PAR was considered to consist largely of off-the-shelf parts, and the team was confident that the first example would work without building a previous prototype. The Sharper's Pond site would thus serve as both the development system and the active base. When Sentinel gave way to Safeguard, the development site moved to North Dakota.

== See also ==
- Comparison of anti-ballistic missile systems
