= Hardpoint (missile defense) =

Proposed anti-ballistic missile system

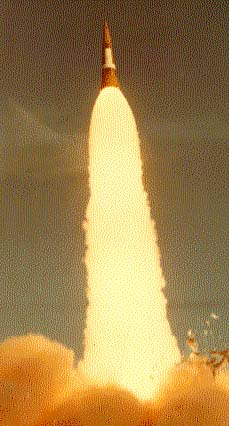
HIBEX test launch at White Sands.

Hardpoint was a proposed short-range anti-ballistic missile (ABM) system conceived by ARPA and developed by the US Army under ARPA's Project Defender program. Hardpoint was designed to exploit the relatively low accuracy of Soviet ICBMs, which would make destroying US missile silos difficult. The idea was to only shoot at warheads which would be expected to impact within lethal distance of silos, ignoring the rest and allowing them to hit the ground. This acted as a force multiplier, allowing a small number of interceptors to offset a large number of Soviet missiles.

In order to fulfill this mission, the Hardpoint concept relied on having extremely rapid and accurate tracking of the incoming warheads. This led to the development of the Hardpoint Demonstration Array Radar, or HAPDAR, a passive array radar system that was built at the White Sands Missile Range in the early 1960s. Hardpoint also relied on waiting until the absolute last second before launching on the incoming warheads, both to ensure there was enough time to accurately track the trajectory as well as to deal with the possibility of maneuvering reentry vehicles. This led to the HiBEX and UpSTAGE missile experiments that tested accelerations as high as 377 g.

There was some interest by the Army and US Air Force in the system, which continued studying the basic concept under the name Hardsite. Ultimately, as had been the case several times in the past, the Air Force eventually rejected any Army involvement in "their" strategic role, and various follow-up studies did not yield results. A later development known as LoADS examined combining the missile and radar into a missile silo as part of the MX missile program, but was ultimately abandoned by Ronald Reagan.

== History ==
=== Nike Zeus ===
The Hardpoint ultimately traces its history to the Nike Zeus program of the late 1950s. Nike Zeus was a general-purpose anti-ballistic missile (ABM) designed to provide defenses against any sort of ballistic missile attack. As the program continued, it became clear that the system was subject to a number of serious problems that suggested it would ultimately be useless before it could even be deployed.

Among the problems was that the Zeus system used mechanically steered radars, requiring one radar for each target. A typical Zeus site might have four of these Target Tracking Radars. This was a reasonable number when the Soviet missile fleet contained a few dozen missiles, but it was clear that they were producing more missiles and the Zeus sites would eventually face a large fleet. A report by the Weapons Systems Evaluation Group (WSEG) concluded that an attack by four warheads would lead to one of them getting through 90% of the time, something the Soviets could easily afford by the time Zeus was fully operational in the early 1960s.

Another serious concern was over the use of radar decoys. These consist of lightweight metal foils or metal-coated plastics that produce radar returns that are indistinguishable from the reentry vehicles when seen on radar at long range. Early ICBMs launched very heavy nuclear warheads, and as lighter warhead designs became available, these missiles had considerable leftover performance they could use to launch these decoys. To Zeus these would appear as additional warheads that had to be attacked, meaning that a single ICBM with a small number of decoys would reach the four-"warhead" limit that Zeus could handle. WSEG suggested even a single missile with decoys would almost certainly defeat Zeus.

If this were not enough, nuclear tests carried out at high altitudes in the late 1950s demonstrated a new and unexpected effect that caused radar to be blacked out across an area of hundreds of miles. Today known as nuclear blackout, the Soviets could use this effect by exploding a single warhead just out of reach of the Zeus missiles, causing a blackout over the entire area. This would prevent the Zeus radars from seeing warheads behind the explosion, and by the time the warheads flew through the blackout area in the high atmosphere, it was too late for the Zeus to attack them.

=== Project Defender ===
As the problems with Zeus became clear, President Eisenhower asked the recently formed ARPA to examine the problem and suggest potential solutions. They organized an umbrella effort known as Project Defender which spawned many sub-projects to consider everything from how to distinguish decoys from warheads at long range, to high-tech weapons such as lasers.

One thing that became clear from these tests was that the problems with decoys and blackout both had the same Achilles heel; they only worked in outer space or the very upper limits of the atmosphere. Decoys were so light that drag began to slow them down while still at high altitude, whereas the much denser warhead did not slow down appreciably until much lower. One could pick out the reentry vehicle by comparing the various decelerations at about 60 kilometres (37 mi) altitude. Blackout was likewise dependent on physical effects that only occurred in the upper atmosphere, with the lower edge around 60 km as well.

This provided a solution to the problems of Zeus; an ABM system could successfully attack the reentry vehicles as long as it could develop tracking information and successfully attack the warheads at altitudes below 60 km. To do so would require a very fast-scanning radar, which was possible through the newly emerging active electronically scanned array (AESA) techniques. Combined with a new computer, such a radar would also be able to track dozens of objects at once, eliminating the possibility of simply overwhelming the system through sheer numbers. The system would also need a missile to match this performance, carrying out interceptions in as little as five seconds. By 1963 it was clear that Zeus was not going to be useful, and the Army was directed to use its funding for the development of a new system incorporating these ideas. This became the Nike-X project.

As part of the same ARPA study, a number of other potential ABM system concepts were considered. While the Army went forward with Nike-X, Project Defender continued examining other possibilities. Among these was the concept that eventually emerged as Hardpoint.

=== Hardpoint ===
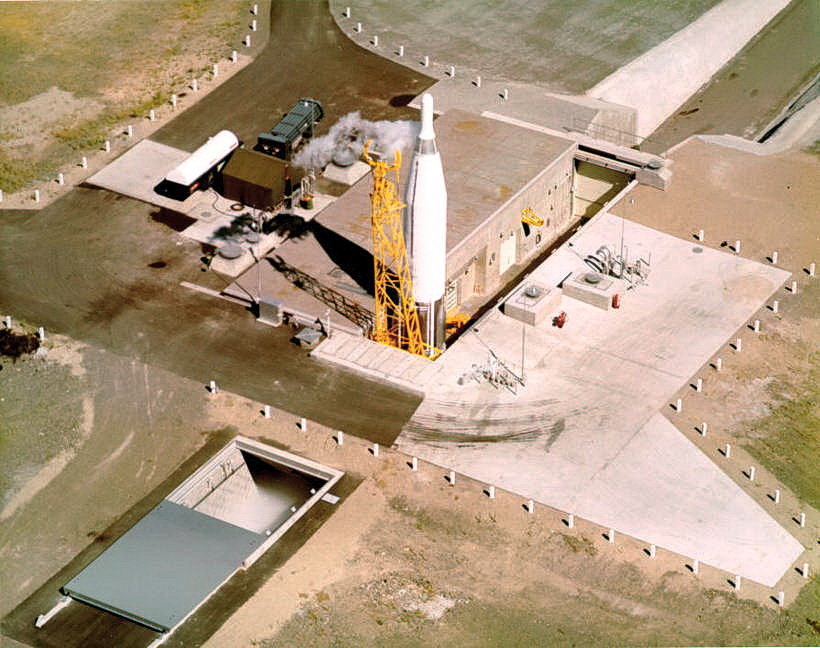
Early ICBMs were completely unprotected while being prepared for launch. As these preparations took about 15 minutes, the missiles were considered vulnerable to sneak attacks.

One of the concepts considered from the earliest days of the Zeus program was the idea of using the missiles to protect the Air Force's Strategic Air Command (SAC) bases. There were only a few dozen of these, and there was concern that a sneak attack by even a limited force of Soviet missiles could destroy a major portion of the SAC bomber fleet on the ground. As crewed bombers gave way to ICBMs in the 1960s, the same concern came to be expressed over the security of the missiles, especially the early examples that had long fueling times and were unprotected while being prepared for launch, which took about 15 minutes.

The survivability of the US ICBM fleet was greatly enhanced by the introduction of missiles stored in a missile silo, and especially with the Minuteman missile which kept its inertial guidance system spun-up at all times and could be launched in a few minutes. Compared to a system protecting a city, where a single warhead avoiding interception may result in millions of casualties, an attack on these silos would have no effect on the other missiles. So in this case, even if the ABM system fails a few interceptions, those silos it does protect will be extremely effective in terms of preserving the counterforce.

Additionally, the interception task was technically simpler. The accuracy of early Soviet guidance systems was known, through intercepts of tracking information by British and US intelligence services, to be on the order of several miles. This meant the chance that an individual Soviet warhead would destroy a US silo was small enough that they would have to use several warheads for every silo to ensure its destruction. The US could track the incoming warheads and determine which, if any, were actually approaching the silos and then attack only those that would fall within that "keep away distance". In such an exchange, a small number of interceptor missiles could successfully defend against a very large counterforce attack, wearing it down to such an extent that it could use up a huge amount of the Soviet missile fleet and leave the US fleet largely untouched. This would leave the US with an enormous strategic advantage, one so great that the Soviets would not be willing to launch an attack with this outcome.

In order for this to be successful, the tracks generated for the incoming warheads would have to be extremely accurate and generated very rapidly. A serious problem for the Nike-X system was the high cost of its MAR radar. This was designed to detect the enemy warheads at long range, quickly develop tracks for them, and then use velocity extraction for decoy discrimination. To provide all of these features, MAR used an AESA radar in which each element in the array was a self-contained transmitter/receiver unit. This was both expensive and extremely complex to wire up.

Finally, the system had to be cheap. The basic idea behind Hardpoint was that a defender needed fewer missiles than the attacker to offset any additions to their fleet, but the missiles and radar systems that drove them were complex and expensive. Therefore, the system had to be less expensive than the missiles it would offset, not just less numerous. Otherwise it might be cheaper to build more Minuteman missiles so that the surviving fleet would be as large as a smaller one protected by Hardpoint. Today this concept is known as the Nitze criteria.

Although Hardpoint testing was considered to be highly successful, by the time the program was winding down it was clear that the Soviets were holding to the ABM Treaty and appeared to be interested in further reductions in warhead count as part of the SALT II process. The project ended with a total expenditure of about $25 million for HAPDAR and HiBEX, and another $26 million for PRESTAGE and UpSTAGE.

=== Hardsite ===
ARPA's work on Hardpoint generated enough interest to lead to some work by the Army and US Air Force on a similar concept known as Hardsite. The difference was that these systems would use the existing Nike-X technology instead of their own dedicated missiles and radars. The original idea was to use a Nike-X site at a city as a way to defend nearby military bases, like an airfield. This could be offered by placing a remote launch site close to the target and running the interceptions from the MAR radar that would have been installed anyway. This would offer some protection for a very low additional cost.

Hardsite was interesting enough for the Army and Air Force to carry out a follow-up study, Hardsite-II, to consider a dedicated Sprint base covering the US missile fields, which were too remote to be combined with another Nike-X site. Although initially supportive of the Hardsite concept, by 1966 the Air Force came to oppose it largely for the same reasons it had opposed Zeus in the same role. If money was to be spent on protecting Minuteman, they felt that money would be better spent by the Air Force than the Army. As Morton Halperin noted:

In part this was a reflex reaction, a desire not to have Air Force missiles protected by "Army" ABMs. ... The Air Force clearly preferred that the funds for missile defense be used by the Air Force to develop new hard rock silos or mobile systems.

=== LoADS ===
Through the early 1970s, as part of the ongoing debate about how to best protect the MX missile from attack, a new Hardpoint-like system was proposed. This system, initially known as LoADS, was based around a missile essentially identical to the original HiBEX. The major change was to use newly developed radar systems that were so small they could be packaged into a container along with the missile. The MX would be packed into a similar container, along with an additional 22 decoy containers. The MX and LoADS would then be moved around randomly between a set of 24 silos so the Soviets would not know which silo they were in. On warning of an attack, the radar would be raised from the silo and watched the incoming warheads to see if any were approaching the one silo containing the MX, and the interceptor missile would only be fired if that was happening. Those warheads that were seen to be falling on the decoy silos, or missing entirely, would simply be ignored. When Ronald Reagan selected Dense Pack as the ultimate basing solution for MX, LoADS, by this time known as Sentry, was cancelled.

== Description ==
Shortly after the decision was made to move from Nike Zeus to Nike-X, Project Defender decided to begin development of a low-cost radar system, the Hard Point Demonstration Army Radar, or HAPDAR, along with a new short-range, high-acceleration missile, HiBEX. During the initial project definition, the US had begun exploring maneuverable reentry vehicles (MARVs), which were intended to avoid Soviet ABM defences by continually moving and thereby upsetting any pre-computed intercept course. ARPA decided to add another phase of study to consider a highly maneuverable second stage that could be used to counter Soviet MARVs. This became the "Upper Stage Acceleration and Guidance Experiment", or UpSTAGE.

=== HAPDAR ===
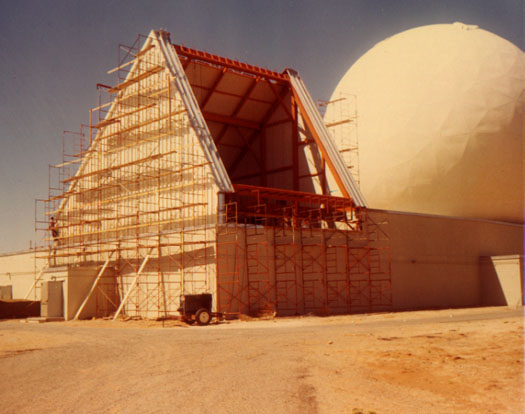
The HAPDAR radar was built as an extension on the existing Zeus Acquisition Radar building.

Hardpoint's mission was significantly different from the one for Nike-X. The area being protected was smaller, the size of the missile field instead of a large suburbanized city, so initial long-range detection and could be handled by other radars like the Perimeter Acquisition Radar (PAR). MAR's discrimination capability was not needed because the decoys and radar blackout were well above the altitudes that the system would operate at. What was needed was very high accuracy and a very fast scanning speed, so that accurate trajectories could be rapidly computed and to a degree of accuracy that allowed the dangerous warheads to be picked out. The result was the Hard Point Demonstration Army Radar, or HAPDAR.

For this task, the ARPA team selected the somewhat simpler passive electronically scanned array (PESA) concept, where there is a single transmitter and receiver, and a series of phase shifters arranged in the array. In the HAPDAR, the transmitter sent out a coherent signal which illuminates the back of the array of shifters on the face of the radar. Each shifter has an antenna on the side facing the transmitter and another on the outside of the array. When the signal is picked up at the back, it travels though a coaxial cable or waveguide to the outer antenna where it is rebroadcast. The shifter has more than one path from the back to the front, each one adding additional length to the overall signal path, thereby delaying the signal by a selected amount. By shifting some of signals and not others, the wavefront changes direction, allowing the beam to the steered with no moving parts.

In the case of the HAPDAR design, Sperry used a new design known as the TACOL, short for Thinned Aperture Computed Lens. The basic concept was that the back of the phase shifter array was normally formed into a curve so the signal reached all of the shifters at the same time. In TACOL, the phase delay shifters are individually modified to insert this same delay, allowing the back face of the antenna to be flat. The system used a single klystron transmitter and had 2165 shifters, each with a three-bit shift (values 0 through 7). An additional 1585 inactive feeds completed the 3750 element antenna.

The system was controlled by a UNIVAC 1218, a militarized version of the UNIVAC 418 computer. It was able to produce up to five tracks at once.

=== HiBEX ===
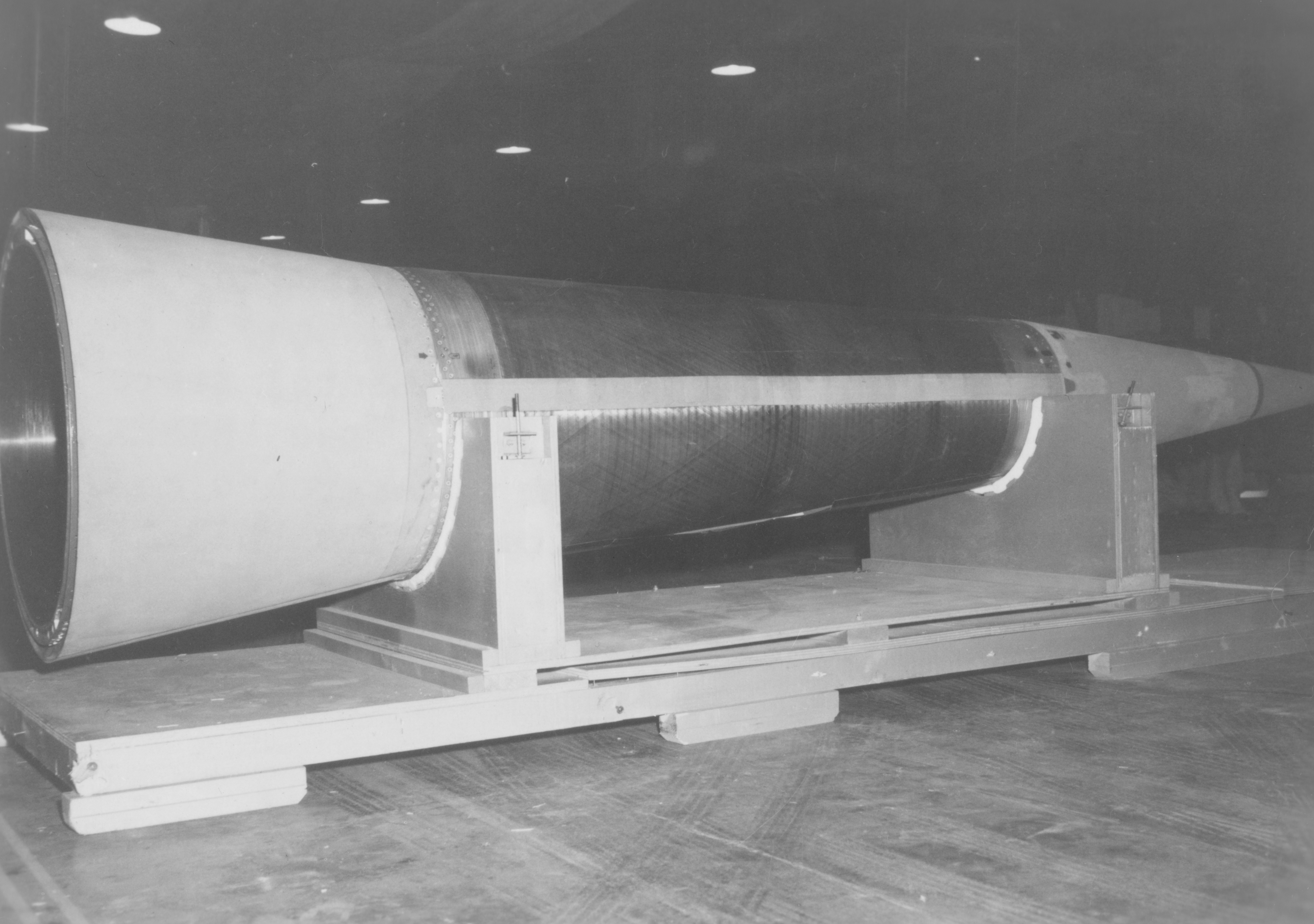
Although not easily visible in this image, the white conical section on the right is the "finlet" system. Gasses injected between the cone and the interior rocket nozzle produced directional thrust.

The goal of Hardpoint was to intercept incoming missiles just far enough away to keep them out of the lethal radius of their warheads. This was nominally set to altitudes of about 20,000 feet (6,100 m). At this altitude, the enemy reentry vehicles would be travelling at about 10,000 feet per second (3,000 m/s), meaning that the interceptor had only seconds from launch to interception. This meant the interceptors would have to be extremely fast.

To explore whether such a system was possible, ARPA and the U.S. Army Missile Command funded development of HiBEX with Boeing as the prime contractor, and Hercules supplying the new solid rocket motor. HIBEX was essentially a smaller version of the Sprint concept, about 16 feet (4.9 m) long and 3.6 feet (1.1 m) in diameter. It was powered by a 2,180 kilonewtons (490,000 lbf) rocket, and as it weighed only 2,600 pounds (1,200 kg), it gave the missile an initial acceleration of 377g, and a top speed of 8,400 feet per second (2,600 m/s). At least seven HiBEX rockets were fired at White Sands Missile Range (WSMR) between February 1965 and January 1966.

=== UpSTAGE ===
With the success of HiBEX, ARPA began initial work on the PRESTAGE project that studied the concept of external burning, a new idea that appeared to provide a simple way to produce huge lateral accelerations. This project was carried out by McDonnell-Douglas, and experimented with a number of different concepts.

In 1968, APRA began the UpSTAGE project. The system used a new "finlet" maneuvering system that injected hot gas between the fuselage and rocket exhaust, which provided enormous lateral thrust up to 300 g and response times in the order of milliseconds. The maneuvering was so rapid that the system had to use the recently developed ring laser gyroscope as mechanical gyroscopes could not react fast enough. Tracking was carried out by the existing Zeus Target Tracking Radars and instructions sent to the UpSTAGE vehicles from the ground. Five UpSTAGE tests were carried out at WSMR between November 1971 and August 1972.
