= Swarmjet =

Swarmjet was an extremely short-range single-shot anti-ballistic missile (ABM) system proposed by the United States as a defensive measure during the development of the MX missile. It consisted of a launcher containing thousands of spin-stabilized unguided rockets that would be fired into the path of an enemy nuclear warhead, enough that it would be highly likely one of the rockets would hit the warhead and destroy it.

The concept worked in concert with the Multiple Protective Shelter (MPS) basing for the MX missile. MPS proposed making about two dozen missile silos for each MX missile, moving the missile between them at random so the Soviets would not know where they were. Each silo was strong enough to survive anything except a direct hit, meaning the Soviets would have to target every silo in order to ensure the missiles were destroyed. With a force of 200 missiles and 4,600 silos, the Soviets would have to use up the majority of their warheads, with most falling on empty silos.

The number of warheads needed could be doubled with a Swarmjet system. Because the U.S. knew where the MX was, and the Soviets did not, they could choose to shoot down the one warhead that was approaching the current location of the MX and ignore the rest. To ensure the MX was destroyed in this case, the Soviets would have to aim two warheads at each silo. With 4,600 silos, the attack would require 9,200 warheads, much more than they were allowed under the SALT treaty.

When MPS was dropped and Dense Pack chosen in 1982, the entire concept no longer worked – the base could be targeted with a small number of warheads, so shooting down one warhead no longer helped. Swarmjet was offered as a way to shoot down multiple warheads over a short period of time, but very little development along these lines was carried out.

== Background ==
=== MX ===
Since the late 1950s, the U.S. Air Force had faced the possibility that the nuclear deterrence role would be handed to the U.S. Navy's Polaris missile fleet. Unlike the Air Force's strategic bombers and ICBMs, the Polaris missiles were essentially invulnerable. As the key concept in deterrence is the assurance that any attack will be met with a counterattack, Polaris was the best way to meet that goal. RAND Corporation wrote a February 1960 report on this called "The Puzzle of Polaris" which was a serious concern to Air Force planners.

Their solution was to re-align the ICBM fleet not as a counterstrike weapon, but specifically as a way to attack any Soviet missiles still left in the ground. Polaris simply did not have the accuracy needed to attack a missile silo, whereas the latest Minuteman missile could do so with some relatively minor upgrades. However, this would require the Minuteman fleet to survive a Soviet sneak attack, and this was a serious concern as Soviet missile technology improved. It was believed that by the late 1970s or early 1980s, the Soviets would be able to destroy as much as 90% of the Air Force fleet while expending only 1/3 of their own ICBM fleet.

In response, the Air Force began development of the MX missile with the explicit intent of making a force that would survive a sneak attack with enough numbers to counterattack the Soviet silos. After much deliberation, the Multiple Protective Shelters, MPS, was selected for deployment. In MPS, each MX would be based in a cell of 23 silos, spaced far enough apart that each silo would have to be attacked independently. The other silos would be filled with decoy missiles, and the single MX would be randomly moved about the cell. A total force of 200 missiles in 4,600 silos would require 4,600 warheads to attack, from a Soviet fleet of 5,928 warheads. This would not ensure MX's survival, but make it so expensive to defeat that it would place the U.S. and Soviets on roughly equal footing after the attack.

MPS could be further improved simply by building more shelters. With 5,500 shelters, over half of the fleet would survive. However, the 4,600 silo deployment already took up a significant portion of the states of Nevada and Utah, finding more space would be difficult.

=== LoADS ===
The U.S. Army had been investigating ABM systems since the 1950s, briefly deploying Safeguard in the 1970s. As part of this research, ARPA had noticed that when used as a silo defensive system, ABMs had a distinct advantage. As the enemy warhead had to fall quite close to a missile silo to destroy it, and Soviet missiles were relatively inaccurate, most of the attacking warheads would fall outside the lethal radius. An ABM system defending silos did not have to fire at every warhead, only those that could be seen falling within that radius. This meant a small number of interceptors could be effective against a large number of enemy warheads.

The Army updated this concept for MX. Under MPS, only one silo would contain a missile, and only the U.S. knew where that missile was. In this case, the interceptor could ignore any warhead not falling on that silo, and by shooting down only one warhead out of 23, they could guarantee that missile would survive. In order to counter this, the Soviets would have to aim two warheads at every silo, assuming one would be lost. Thus a single interceptor was just like doubling the number of silos, although it took up no room.

Of course, the Soviets could target the interceptor if they knew where it was. To avoid this, LoADS was packed into a container the size, shape and weight as the MX missile. (LoADS, for Low Altitude Air Defense System, was the name the Sentry system was known by for most of its existence.) This too would be moved about the cell, so the Soviets could not know where it was. There were lingering concerns whether or not the system could actually be built and packaged into an MX-like container. To do so the interceptor itself would have to be quite small, but more importantly, the radar and fire control systems would also have to fit.

=== Origins ===
Swarmjet traces its history ultimately to a series of suggestions made by Richard Garwin as alternatives to large-scale ABM systems like Safeguard. Among these ideas were a "bed of nails" consisting of vertical steel spikes surrounding the silo that would destroy the warhead before it hit the ground and triggered, jamming systems to interrupt radar fuses, the dust defense where small nuclear warheads would be set off while the warheads approached and throw huge amounts of dust into the air that would abrade the warheads, and a non-nuclear version of the same concept, the "curtain of steel pellets".

The last of these was picked up by Bernard Feld and Kosta Tsipis in a major article in Scientific American in 1979. They proposed replacing the shotgun-like projectiles with swarms of small unguided rockets that would fire at a range of about 1 kilometre (0.62 mi). As they were unguided, they suggested that they would not be considered interceptor missiles under the ABM treaty, but also suggested that a renegotiation might be required.

The Army quickly picked up these options, developing two concepts. The first, Project Quick-Shot, was basically identical to the Feld and Tsipis version, although they did consider some sort of low-cost guidance system as well. A second concept launched optical trackers into space in the path of the incoming missiles, and used their data to fine-tune the launch of unguided rockets that would work at longer ranges. As this had no radar component, it would bypass provisions in the ABM treaty over the number and placement of radar sites. However, whether any of this was seriously considered at the time is debatable; in 1976 the Army placed a contract with McDonnell Douglas to study a low-altitude concept under the name ST-2, but this was the nuclear-armed LoADS concept.

=== Army interest ===
Seeking a backup in case LoADS, by this time known as Sentry, failed to meet its size goals, the Army and Lawrence Livermore National Laboratory (LLNL) reintroduced the idea of the shotgun-like defence. If LoADS did work, any money spent on a backup would be wasted, so Swarmjet was proposed as an extremely low-cost, low-risk solution. A significant advantage of Swarmjet compared to LoADS was that it was non-nuclear. This meant the system could be kept in a state of high alert at all times, as an accidental firing would not result in a nuclear explosion.

A Swarmjet installation consisted of a radar and launcher placed north of the defended site – in this case an MX cell. The launcher would contain thousands of spin-stabilized rockets. The radar would determine which warhead was approaching the occupied MX silo and then fire the entire set of rockets in its path in a shotgun-like salvo. The warhead would be destroyed in the hypervelocity impact.

While there was widespread agreement that such a collision would indeed destroy a warhead, there was disagreement on how many rockets would be needed to ensure one hit the warhead. This was exacerbated by uncertainties in the environment they would fly through, which would include the dust and debris of the explosions of the warheads they chose not to intercept. Any such uncertainty requires more rockets, to the point where it was considered unlikely the system would be able to fit into an MX container.

In this case, the solution would be to use a separate launchers, but that would open them to attack. To mitigate this, a separate launcher would be needed for every silo, an expensive option. Various deployment scenarios using multiple radars and launchers were outlined.

=== Dense pack ===
The political problem of building thousands of missiles silos that would be among the first targets hit in a war across two states quickly became politically impossible. Described as an "extravaganza", politicians in both states were set against the idea, notably powerful Nevada Senator Paul Laxalt. When the Church of Jesus Christ of Latter-day Saints came out against it, any hope of deploying MPS was over.

In 1981, President Reagan came to power partially on a plank of U.S. military inadequacy blamed on the Carter administration. As part of their plans to improve their strategic posture, in an October 1981 Reagan gave a speech on strategic forces. He had close ties with Laxalt, and called MPS "a Rube Goldberg scheme". Instead, he suggested placing MX in existing Minuteman and Titan II silos to "restore a sense of national will", before the final decision on a basing solution was made.

During a second speech on the topic on 22 November 1982, Reagan announced that the missiles would be deployed in a dense pack. This consisted of a series of super-hardened silos that could withstand more than 10,000 psi (70 MPa) of overpressure, compared to 5,000 psi of the MPS proposal. Such a silo would require a very close miss in order to be destroyed, so close that the explosion of one warhead attacking a silo would kick up so much dust that another arriving to attack a nearby silo would be destroyed by the impact with the dust. This "fratricide theory" was highly criticized due to the ease with which the Soviets could modify their warheads and circumvent this design. All that was required was that several warheads arrive and be detonated within a few milliseconds of each other, so the blast waves did not reach each other before completing destruction of the silo. Such timing could be easily achieved with commercially available clocks. Congress again rejected the system.

As part of the same position statement, Reagan spoke out against an ABM defense of the fields, stating "we do not wish to embark on any course of action that could endanger the current ABM treaty so long as it is observed by the Soviet Union". Sentry was cancelled in February 1983.

=== Realignment ===
In spite of this, Swarmjet was once again raised as a possibility to protect the dense pack deployment. In this case the distance between the silos was so small, about 1,800 feet (550 m), that a single set of radars could control the entire battle, with one or more Swarmjet launchers placed between the MX silos. If the Soviets sent over many warheads closely spaced, a single Swarmjet salvo could break up the attack. To avoid this attack the warheads would have to arrive further apart in time, but this would lead to the possibility of them destroying each other. A successful attack would have to be property timed, and while such a thing was certainly not difficult to arrange, the attack would be stretched out enough that the U.S. would have time to launch a counterattack. Even in that case, Swarmjet itself would be able to handle multiple interceptions given enough time, further complicating the attack.

A major downside to the Swarmjet proposal is that by any reasonable reading of the ABM Treaty it was illegal; the treaty states that "Each Party undertakes not to deploy ABM systems for the defense of the territory of its country and not to provide a base for such defense, and not to deploy ABM system for defense of an individual region except as provided for in Article III of this Treaty." Article III, amended in 1974, limited the U.S. to a single defended area, the Minuteman missile fields near Grand Forks, North Dakota. This was far from the desired basing for the MX in Wyoming, so if new silos were constructed they could not be defended without amending the treaty. Reagan justified the deployment by claiming that Swarmjet was not an ABM, but a form of "active hardening".

Another problem with Swarmjet was that it could be argued that it eliminated the need for MX. Its entire purpose was not to break up a Soviet attack entirely, but simply introduce so much uncertainty into an attack that they could not consider it. Swarmjet would do this for any attack, whether on MX in dense pack, in existing Minuteman silos, or the existing Minuteman fleet. So if Swarmjet did work, it argued against spending money on MX as well. It is speculated that this is the major reason why Swarmjet saw so little official interest in the early 1980s.

=== Scowcroft Commission ===
The basing mode for MX was put in the hands of a committee led by the National Security Advisor, Brent Scowcroft, called the "President's Commission on Strategic Forces". Their 1983 report essentially stated that the issue of ICBM vulnerability was an illusion; they concluded the Soviets could not contemplate any attack that left any significant fraction of the U.S. deterrent force in place, notably the SLBM force, and they could find no scenario under which this could possibly occur. Further, they reported that if even a "totally effective defense" were constructed, there could never be confidence that such a system would not be defeated through subterfuge. Although there is no record of Swarmjet being officially cancelled, calls for its construction were never officially answered and the matter simply disappeared from the historical record.
