= Sharpner's Pond Anti-Ballistic Missile Site =

Coordinates: 42°38′47.37″N 71°2′13.44″W

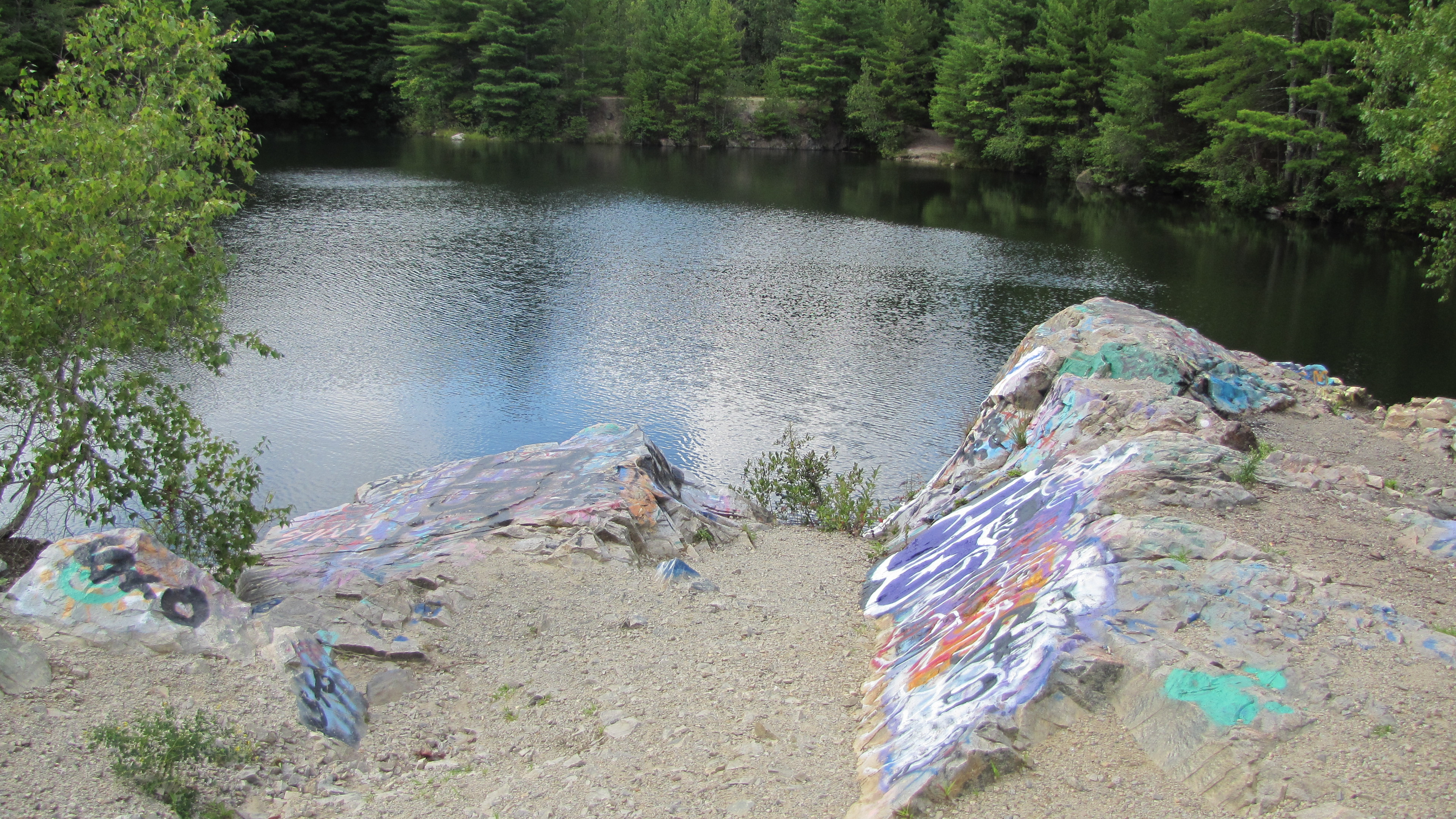
Water-filled excavation pit at Sharpner's Pond Anti-Ballistic Missile Site, August 2023.

The Sharpner's Pond Anti-Ballistic Missile Site is a location in North Andover, Massachusetts, which was slated to be the site of a Perimeter Acquisition Radar facility for the Sentinel program. Initially, an access road and a large excavation for an underground power plant were constructed at the site. However, in light of mounting public opposition over the construction of Sentinel sites, the Sentinel program ended before substantial construction took place at the Sharpner's Pond location.

All activity at the Sharpner's Pond site halted on March 14, 1969, when contracts with construction agencies were terminated. The land was later transferred back to the Department of Conservation from the Department of Defense and became part of Boxford State Forest. The area was badly damaged by the work conducted by the site and has not fully recovered.

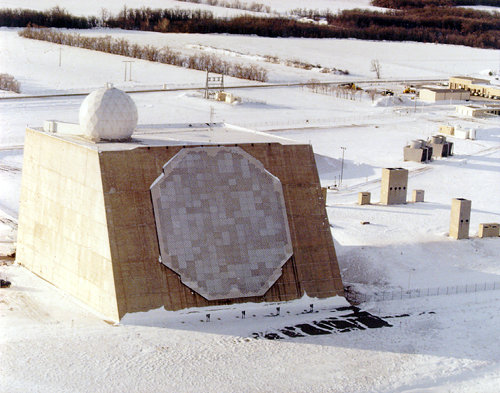
Perimeter Acquisition Radar at Cavalier Air Force Station in North Dakota. A radar similar to this would have been constructed in North Andover.

== Confusion with Sharpners Pond ==
After maintenance of the site stopped, the excavated area filled with rain and groundwater, forming a quarry. The pond formed by the excavation at the site is frequently confused with the nearby Sharpners Pond, which is privately owned and not part of the Boxford State Forest. Sharpners Pond is not accessible to the public.

== Drownings at excavation site ==
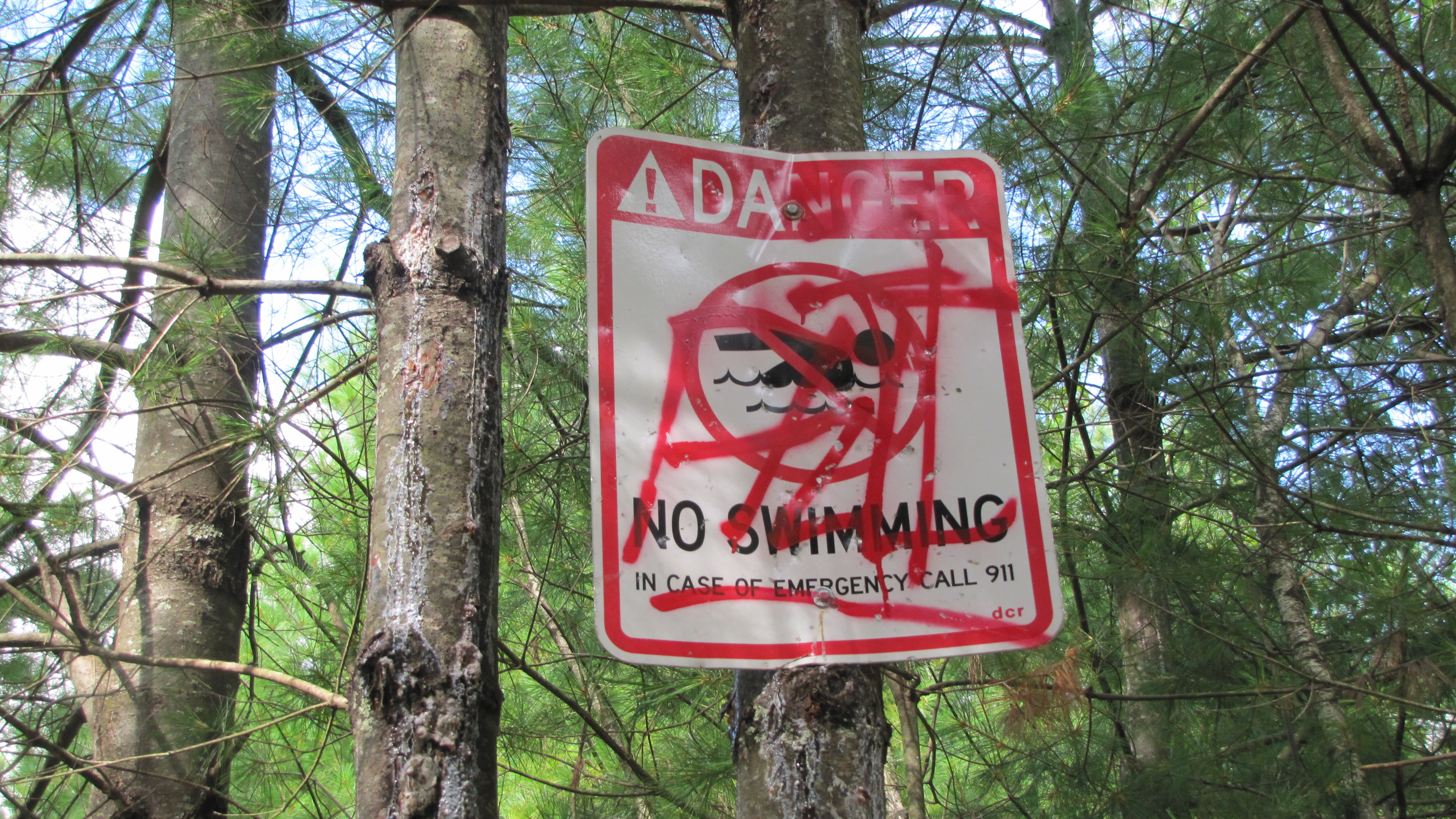
Vandalized "Danger, No Swimming" sign posted near the water-filled excavation pit

The quarry formed by the excavation at Sharpner's Pond Anti-Ballistic Missile Site is not designated for recreational use due to depth, low temperature, and visibility due to silt. A danger sign posted along the access road leading to the excavation warns visitors to not swim in the water although it has since been vandalized. Between 2004 and 2008, three drownings resulted from swimming in the quarry.

In 2008 it was reported that police activity had increased in the area to combat swimming and after-hours use of the site. A gate has since been installed at the entrance to the access road.

In 2008, it was reported that a memorial had been spray-painted at the site onto rocks near the water reading "R.I.P. Keolong Keath 6/16/2004".
