= Cost-exchange ratio =

Concept in anti-ballistic missile defence

In anti-ballistic missile (ABM) defence the cost-exchange ratio is the ratio of the incremental cost to the aggressor of getting one additional warhead through the defence screen, divided by the incremental cost to the defender of offsetting the additional missile. For instance, a single new ICBM might require a single new ABM to counter it, and if they both cost the same, the cost-exchange ratio would be 1:1.

Throughout the Cold War, the cost-exchange ratio was almost always strongly in favor of the offense. Some of this has to do with the fact that an ICBM can be aimed at any target, which the defender cannot know in advance. To shoot that warhead down, the defender has to wait until it appears on radar, which typically happens only a few hundred miles from the target. This means a single defensive missile cannot be used to counter a single warhead; ABMs have to be deployed in a spread-out fashion so that one can respond no matter where the warhead appears. Even if a single ABM is needed to shoot down that single new missile, that single new ABM would be needed to be added to multiple bases depending on their range. For short-range weapons like the Sprint, dozens are needed for every new Soviet warhead.

Through the 1950s and 60s there were intense ongoing debates about the exact figures of the cost-exchange ratio. This ended with the introduction of multiple independently targetable re-entry vehicles, or MIRVs. MIRV allowed a single ICBM to launch multiple warheads, each attacking a different target. Now every new ICBM required dozens and dozens of new ABMs to counter it, swinging the cost-exchange ratio so dramatically in favor of the offense that it ended any debate on the topic. Consideration of cost-exchange ratios was influential in persuading the United States and the Soviet Union to sign the ABM Treaty.

The topic was once again a consideration in the era of the Strategic Defense Initiative, SDI or "Star Wars". In this case a space-based weapon such as Project Excalibur attacked ICBMs before they released their warheads, improving the exchange ratio for the interceptor at the expensive of requiring many of them distributed around the Earth in orbit to have one within range. Ultimately these technologies failed to mature and the system was abandoned with the ending of the Cold War.

== See also ==
- Nitze criteria - the concept that the cost-exchange ratio must be positive for a weapon to be worth deploying
