= Meck Island =

Island in the Pacific Ocean

Coordinates: 9°0′5.93″N 167°43′35.90″E

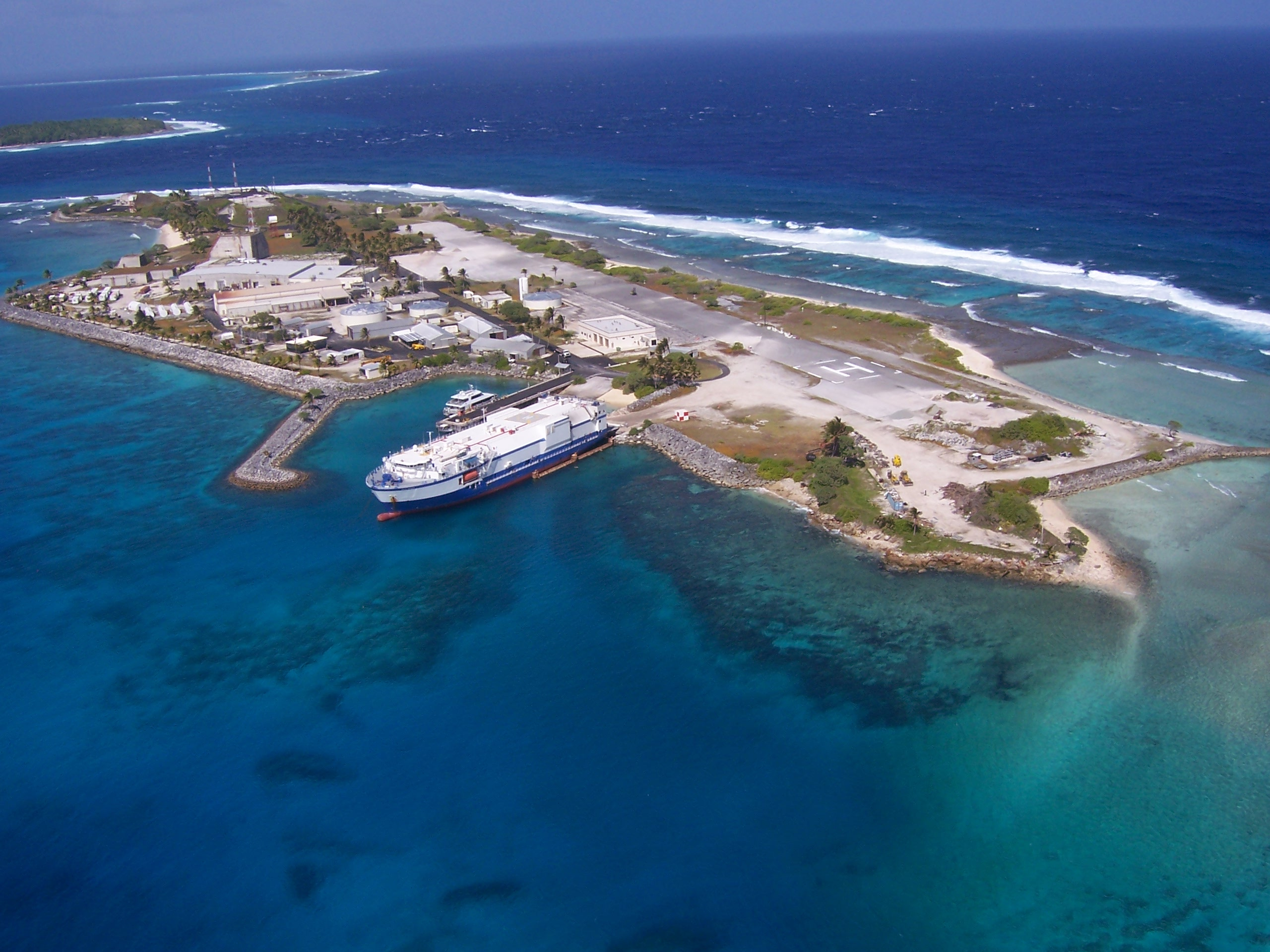
Aerial view of Meck Island

Meck Island (Marshallese: Meik, [mʲeik]) is part of the Kwajalein Atoll in the Ralik Chain in the Republic of the Marshall Islands, 2,100 nautical miles (3,900 km) southwest of Honolulu, Hawaii.

== Island ==
Meck is part of the Ronald Reagan Ballistic Missile Defense Test Site, and a launch site for anti-ballistic missiles and launch vehicles is based there. It was originally developed in support of the Sentinel program of the 1960s, and hosted a radar site and launchers for Sprint and Spartan missiles. It has been used for a variety of tests since then, including the Safeguard program, Homing Overlay Experiment, Exoatmospheric Kill Vehicle, THAAD and others.
