= Dense Pack =

Nuclear warfare strategy

Dense Pack is a strategy for basing intercontinental ballistic missiles (ICBMs) for the purpose of maximizing their survivability in case of a surprise nuclear first strike on their silos conducted by a hostile foreign power. The strategy was developed under the Reagan administration as a means of safeguarding America's inventory of MX missiles during the final decade of the Cold War. It was never used; MX was deployed in existing silos and then removed from service as the Cold War ended.

== MX basing debate ==
The U.S. commitments under the Anti-Ballistic Missile (ABM) Treaty prevented the development and construction of adequate ABM installations around its nuclear missile silos. Therefore, it was decided that new and unconventional strategies for protecting these military assets from a sneak-attack had to be developed.

The original concept had been to place the MX missile silos on the reverse side of tall hills or mesas. This was known as "reverse inclination basing". Enemy warheads approach at an angle of about 25° above horizontal, so if the slope of the hill was greater, the warhead would impact the hill short of the silo, outside its lethal range. This concept relies entirely on the warheads approaching from a certain direction, and as the Soviets introduced their Fractional Orbital Bombardment System and high-angle "lofted" trajectories, this no longer offered any extra protection. The introduction of submarine launched ballistic missiles, which could be launched from any direction, ended it as a useful concept.

In 1979, after a long debate on the topic, President Jimmy Carter selected the "multiple protective shelters" concept for basing the MX. In this system, the 200 MX missiles would be partnered with many thousands of silos, and the missiles would be periodically moved among the silos so the Soviets would not know where they were. In order to attack the MX fleet and do any significant damage, they would have to attack every silo. With enough silos, they would use up much of their warhead inventory to destroy only 200 missiles, a cost that was so high they would not contemplate it. Derided as the "racetrack" proposal, the primary problem was that it required huge tracts of land. It was immediately opposed in Nevada, and eventually fell out of favor in Utah.

== Dense Pack ==
When Ronald Reagan took over in 1981 he agreed to reexamine the basing question, as opposition by Nevada senator Paul Laxalt had become overwhelming by this point. For the immediate future, 60 MXs would be placed in surplus Titan II missile silos while a final basing solution was chosen. After an equally long and contentious debate, the Dense Pack system was chosen. The new strategy was mentioned in a speech by President Ronald Reagan in 1982.

According to the Dense Pack strategy, a series of ten to twelve hardened silos would be grouped closely together in a line. This line of silos would generally run north-to-south, as the primary flight path for Soviet inbound nuclear missiles would be expected to come from the north over the North Pole. Each "super-hardened" silo would require an almost direct hit ground burst to destroy the missile within. When the first warhead went off, it would create a huge cloud of debris that was ejected thousands of feet into the sky. When the next warhead arrived it would hit this debris and be destroyed. Even if a warhead was successful in reaching the ground, it would create more dust and then lower the chance of the next one working.

This basic idea had been considered during the Minuteman missile era under the name dust defense. In this case, it was US nuclear bombs buried near the silos that created the cloud of debris. This was abandoned because the "dust" would be extremely radioactive and millions would die when the resulting fallout fell back to the ground. In this case, however, it was Soviet warheads causing the fallout, which was politically acceptable.

The proposed Dense Pack initiative met with strong criticism in the media and in the government, dismissed as "duncepack" or "sixpack". Detractors of the Dense Pack strategy pointed out a number of flaws.

First, the advent of multiple independently targetable reentry vehicles, or MIRV, negated the concept due to their ability to conduct a time-on-target barrage. Since all the warheads were arriving from a single missile, they could easily be launched to arrive within seconds of each other. In this case, the explosions would not yet have created the massive cloud of dirt, and they would all fall largely unimpeded.

Secondly, there were widespread doubts at the time that the hardened nature of the armored missile silos were as robust as the military claimed. If the silos could not survive a near-miss, then clustering the silos would allow a single warhead to destroy multiple silos, perhaps all of them. If the silos were not as hard as claimed, Dense Pack actually lowered their survival rate.

Finally, Dense Pack was perceived by some to be a provocative, if not overtly hostile measure at a time when nuclear warfare seemed to be a distinct possibility. Ultimately, the U.S. House of Representatives rejected using the Dense Pack strategy by a 245–176 vote.

The U.S. Air Force reconsidered the use of the Dense Pack strategy in 1986, at least in part to find a way to add 50 additional missiles authorized by Congress only if a "safe" basing strategy could be found. There is no evidence that the Dense Pack strategy was ever implemented.
