= Nitze criteria =

Nitze (beside Reagan) was awarded the Presidential Medal of Freedom shortly after introducing the Nitze criteria.

The Nitze criteria are three basic requirements that encompass the Reagan administration's definition of a successful Ballistic Missile Defense (BMD) deployment. They are named for Paul Nitze, Reagan's chief arms control negotiator, who proposed them in a 1985 speech.

== Missile defense and arms reduction ==
A key plank in the Reagan administration's thinking about BMD was that a successful system was not simply a defensive system to protect the United States; its ultimate goal was to be so effective as to render ICBMs essentially useless and lead to their abandonment. Nitze summarized this concept in a 20 February 1985 speech to the Philadelphia World Affairs Council:

For the next ten years, we should seek a radical reduction in the number and power of existing and planned offensive and defensive nuclear arms, whether land-based, space-based, or otherwise. We should even now be looking forward to a period of transition, beginning possibly ten years from now, to effective non-nuclear defensive forces, including defenses against offensive nuclear arms. This period of transition should lead to the eventual elimination of nuclear arms, both offensive and defensive. A nuclear-free world is an ultimate objective to which we, the Soviet Union, and all other nations can agree.

== Success criteria ==
Nitze stated that if a BMD system were to be successful in fulfilling this role, it needed to meet three criteria.

The first two criteria are simple: the proposed system has to actually work, and it has to be able to survive attacks against it. While these may seem obvious, many earlier systems failed one or the other of these criteria. For example, Nike Zeus was highly vulnerable to attacks by the very ICBMs it was supposed to defend against, while the later Spartan missile left many questions about its ability to actually destroy its targets at reasonable range.

The third criterion, the one the criteria is really known for, is that the system must be "cost effective at the margin". This is essentially a common-sense rewording of the earlier concept of the cost-exchange ratio, the amount of money needed to counteract a dollar of offensive capability. Previous BMD systems had always been far more expensive than the missiles they were designed to shoot down; during the Nike-X program in the 1960s it was estimated that every dollar the Soviets spent on new ICBMs would require $20 of spending to counter it, a 20-to-1 ratio.

If the US went ahead with Nike-X, the Soviets would see their strategic position being eroded; every Sprint would essentially remove one Soviet ICBM from the attack. The Soviets could address this loss of strategic power simply by building another ICBM. If the US responded by building even more interceptors, the Soviets would do the same. Due to the cost disparity, the Soviets could easily afford to win any resulting arms race. It was widely believed within the US that such a system would lead to less stability — the additional ICBMs increased the risk of an accidental launch. Nothing about Nike-X suggested that it would cause the Soviet Union to give up on ICBMs, nor was there any expectation that the system would have this effect.

If a BMD system were to cause the "other side" to consider dropping their offensive weapons entirely, it had to be economically advantageous. That is, if the US were to spend $1 upgrading their system, it had to cost more than that for the Soviets to counter that upgrade. Then the US could counter any possible Soviet ICBM building program and afford to do so until the Soviet Union went bankrupt. In such a situation, the Soviets might consider building their own defences instead, or bargaining away missiles on both sides in order to return to some level of balance.

This "marginal" cost, the cost of offsetting additions to the offensive fleet, was now a key criterion in building such a system, and Nitze made it central to the concept in the same speech:

If the new technologies cannot meet these standards, we are not about to deploy them.

== Impact and assessment ==
The Nitze criteria brought clarity to a field that had been plagued with uncertainty over even the most basic definitions; what did it mean for a BMD system to be "successful"? Earlier debates had generally centered around the number of lives saved, or the cost of a system; Robert McNamara had infamously stated that Nike Zeus would cost $700 per life saved, while a fallout shelter would do the same for $40.

Nitze's criteria shifted the focus away from absolute costs to a very simple statement about whether the system would ultimately increase or decrease the total number of weapons.

According to Strobe Talbott, the criterion gained "the status of holy writ within much of the Administration". The criteria were judged to be so clear and obvious that they were ultimately adopted as law by Congress as a way to stop the deployment of interim BMD systems that would offer no real advantage.

== Criticism ==
Nitze's focus entirely on marginal costs was seen by some as a disadvantage. For example, if the up-front costs for the basic system bankrupted the nation, then obviously the marginal cost would no longer be a major issue. Moreover, the concept only really applies to a massive system; if the goal is simply to protect against accidental launches or very limited 3rd-country attacks, then marginal cost is not important, whereas if the goal is to protect the US deterrent force, then it has to survive only to the extent that it accomplishes that mission – more Soviet missiles does not add to the threat to the deterrent.
