= Dust defense =

Anti-ballistic missile system proposal

Dust defense, sometimes called environmental defense, was a proposed anti-ballistic missile (ABM) system considered for protecting both Minuteman and MX Peacekeeper missile silos from Soviet attack.

== Operation ==
The system works by burying a number of high-yield warheads near the missile field below the anticipated flight corridor of approaching enemy reentry vehicles (warheads). Approximately five to ten minutes before the arrival of the enemy warheads, the dust defense warheads would be detonated, sending a cloud of dust high into the atmosphere. Enemy RVs would strike this cloud of dust at approximately 7 kilometres per second (4.3 mi/s) which would rapidly abrade the RV's heat shield causing the warhead to fail due to reentry heating or for the warhead to be knocked off course.

The effectiveness of the system depended on the hardness of enemy RVs to abrasion and the yield of the weapon used. Approximately 1/3 million tonnes (330×10^{6} kg) of dust would be produced per megaton of warhead yield. While it's possible that an RV could be hardened against the effects of this dust, doing so would carry a steep penalty in RV weight.

== Advantages and disadvantages of the system ==
The advantage of the system compared to more conventional interceptor based ABM systems is that dust defense provides a "screen" that – while active – provides protection regardless of decoys and the number of warheads used.

Dust defense also has the advantage of being an "unambiguous" defense, in that the system is only seen as suitable for defending hard targets such as ICBM silos and therefore it only protects retaliatory capability. By only protecting retaliatory capability the system is thought to help preserve the balance of mutually assured destruction instead of degrading this balance as an ABM system protecting population centers would. Ignoring the issues of detonating a dust defense warhead near population centers, dust defense only provides protection for thirty minutes to an hour; long enough to allow for ICBMs to launch, but once the dust cloud settles the city remains to be retargeted.

One of the issues with the system is that of a false alarm. Due to fallout and the consequences of detonating a nuclear weapon on your own soil, the consequences of a false alarm are much more severe than in found in interceptor based ABM. However, during a false alarm if a nation is forced to use launch on warning to prevent the destruction of their ICBM force on the ground, a nation would receive massive casualties from the enemy's retaliatory attack. Therefore, a dust defense system to prevent the need for launch on warning would be safer as in a false alarm you have only slightly irradiated some of your nation instead of facing the full brunt of a retaliatory attack.

Dust defense – like any other ground burst nuclear detonation – would produce fallout. However, the stationary nature of the system means that weight and size is not an issue, so very low fission fraction technologies developed for Project Plowshare could be used to reduce the effects of fallout. One source alleges that fission fractions of less than 2% in a 100 kilotonnes of TNT (0.42 PJ) weapon would be possible. This would be less than a percent of the fission produced by Soviet warheads the system stops. Another source claims that by assembling the weapons inside underground vaults and then surrounding the weapons with borated water (which readily absorbs neutrons), fission fractions could be reduced to 1% of that of a conventional fission fraction weapon.

== Variations ==
A variation of dust defense was proposed to instead time detonation to several seconds before the RVs detonated. Instead of destroying enemy RVs through dust, this would destroy RVs through the impact (instead of abrasion) of material thrown up by the blast. This proposal was believed to have a greater chance of success than the abrasion concept (which was thought to require testing and had uncertainties) while also providing a cloud of abrasive dust that could also destroy RVs. This system was proposed to defend Dense Pack.

Dense pack itself was based on the dust defense concept, except in its basic form the dust was created by Soviet warheads attacking dense pack.

== See also ==
Ash Carter – Author of Ballistic Missile Defense and later US Secretary of Defense.
