= Nuclear blackout =

Disruption of radio signals by nuclear detonation

Nuclear blackout, also known as fireball blackout or radar blackout, is an effect caused by explosions of nuclear weapons that disturbs radio communications and causes radar systems to be blacked out or heavily refracted so they can no longer be used for accurate tracking and guidance. Within the atmosphere, the effect is caused by the large volume of ionized air created by the energy of the explosion, while above the atmosphere it is due to the action of high-energy beta particles released from the decaying bomb debris. At high altitudes, the effect can spread over large areas, hundreds of kilometers. The effect slowly fades as the fireball dissipates.

The effect was known from the earliest days of nuclear testing when radar systems were used to track the nuclear mushroom clouds at very long distances. Its extended effects when exploded outside the atmosphere were first noticed in 1958 as part of the Hardtack and Argus nuclear tests, which caused widespread radio interference extending over thousands of kilometers. The effect was so disconcerting that both the Soviets and US broke the informal testing moratorium that had been in place since late 1958 to run series of tests to gather further information on the various high-altitude effects like blackout and electromagnetic pulse (EMP).

Blackout is a particular concern for anti-ballistic missile (ABM) systems. By exploding a warhead in the upper atmosphere just beyond the range of defensive missiles, an attacker can blanket a wide area of the sky beyond which additional approaching warheads cannot be seen. When those warheads emerge from the blackout area there may not be enough time for the defensive system to develop tracking information and attack them. This was a serious concern for the LIM-49 Nike Zeus program of the late 1950s, and one of the reasons it was ultimately canceled. A key discovery revealed in testing was that the effect cleared more quickly for higher frequencies. Later missile defense designs used radars operating at higher frequencies in the UHF and microwave region to mitigate the effect.

== Bomb effects ==
=== Within the atmosphere ===
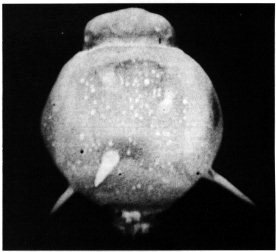
This image of the Hardtack II Lea test shot was taken milliseconds after detonation. The radiative fireball has already formed and the expanding shock wave is continuing the expansion. The spikes at the bottom are due to the rope trick effect.

When a nuclear bomb is exploded near ground level, the dense atmosphere interacts with many of the subatomic particles being released. This normally takes place within a short distance, on the order of meters. This energy heats the air, promptly ionizing it to incandescence and causing a roughly spherical fireball to form within microseconds.

Proceeding at a slower speed is the actual explosion, which creates a powerful shock wave moving outward. The energy released by the shock wave is enough to compression heat the air into incandescence, creating a second fireball. This second fireball continues to expand, passing the radiative one. As it expands, the amount of energy in the shock wave drops according to the inverse-square law, while additional energy is lost through direct radiation in the visible and ultraviolet spectrum. Eventually the shock wave loses so much energy that it no longer heats the air enough to cause it to glow. At that point, known as breakaway, the shock front becomes transparent, and the fireball stops growing.

The diameter of the fireball for a bomb exploded clear of the ground can be estimated using the formula:

$D = (Y\frac{\rho_0}{\rho})^\frac{1}{3}$ kilometers

Where $Y$ is the yield in megatons, and $\frac{\rho_0}{\rho}$ is the ratio of the sea level air density to the air density at altitude. So, a 1 megatonne of TNT (4.2 PJ) bomb exploded at a burst altitude around 5,000 feet (1,500 m) (Note: Altitudes in nearly all parts of the world are always expressed in feet (aircraft altimeters are similarly always calibrated in feet). The only exception was the former USSR which expressed altitude in metres, and calibrated its aircraft altimeters to match. This continues to be the practice today with most former USSR countries still using metres mainly because of inherited aircraft fleets.) will expand to about 1 kilometre (3,300 ft). The ratio $\frac{\rho_0}{\rho}$ can be calculated over a wide range by assuming an exponential relationship:

$\frac{\rho}{\rho_0} = e^{-\frac{h}{22000}}$

where $h$ is the altitude of the burst in feet. So the same burst at 50,000 feet (15,000 m) will be at a pressure of about 0.1 atmospheres, resulting in a fireball on the order of 2,150 metres (7,050 ft) in diameter, about twice the size of one near the ground. For a high altitude burst, say 250,000 feet (76 km), the fireball will expand to about 46 kilometres (29 mi) in diameter.

=== Outside the atmosphere ===
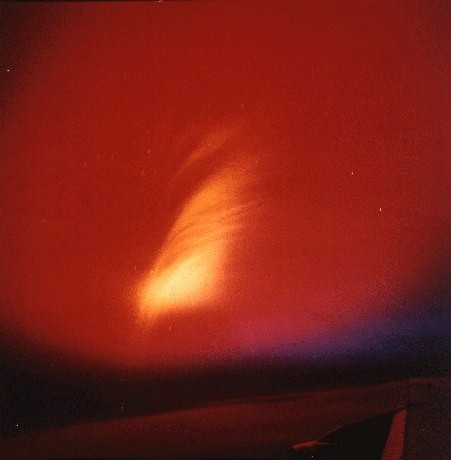
The bomb debris from Starfish Prime followed the Earth's magnetic lines, creating this fan-shaped fireball. Below, the beta particles released by these debris cause a red ionization disk covering much of the sky.

When the bomb is exploded outside the atmosphere, generally any altitude above about 100 kilometres (330,000 ft), the lack of interaction with the air changes the nature of the fireball formation. In this case, the various subatomic particles can travel arbitrary distances, and continue to outpace the expanding bomb debris. The lack of atmosphere also means that no shockwave forms, and it is only the glowing bomb debris themselves that forms the fireball. In these sorts of explosions, the fireball itself is not a significant radar issue, but the particles' interactions with the atmosphere below them causes a number of secondary effects that are just as effective at blocking radar as a fireball at low altitude.

For simple geometric reasons, about half of the particles released by the explosion will be traveling towards the Earth and interact with the upper layers of the atmosphere, while the other half travels upwards into space. The particles penetrate the atmosphere to a depth depending on their energy:

Particles	Energy	Altitude
fission debris		150 kilometers
X-rays	4 keV	80 kilometers
beta particles	1 MeV	60 kilometers
gamma rays	3 MeV	30 kilometers
neutrons	1 MeV	30 kilometers

Two of these effects are particularly notable. The first is due to the gammas, which arrive as a burst directly below the explosion and promptly ionize the air, causing a huge pulse of downward moving electrons. The neutrons, arriving slightly later and stretched out in time, cause similar effects but less intense and over a slightly longer time. These gammas and neutrons are the source of the nuclear electromagnetic pulse, or EMP, which can damage electronics that are not shielded from its effects.

The second important effect is caused by the high energy beta particles. These are constantly being created by the radioactive decay of the uranium tamper that surrounds the fusion core, so the magnitude of this effect is largely a function of the size of the bomb and its physical dispersal in space. Since betas are both lightweight and electrically charged, they follow the Earth's magnetic field. This returns upward moving betas back to the Earth, although perhaps not at the same location.

Unlike the gammas, which ionize only the atoms they strike, a rapidly moving beta induces enormous magnetic fields in atoms they pass nearby, causing them to ionize while slowing the beta down. Each beta can thus cause multiple ionizations, as well as being a free electron on its own. This causes a much larger but spread out current pulse of lower energy electrons released from these air molecules. Since the reaction takes place between 50 and 60 km, the result is a disk of ionized air about 10 km thick and (typically) several hundred kilometers across.

Additionally, betas that are traveling roughly parallel to the Earth's magnetic fields will be trapped and cause similar effects where the magnetic field intersects the atmosphere. At any given longitude there are two locations where this occurs, north and south of the equator, and the effect is maximized by exploding the bomb within one of these locations in order to create as strong a signal as possible at the magnetic conjugate area. Known as the Christofilos effect, this was the subject of serious research in the late 1950s, but the effect was less powerful than expected.

== Blackout effects ==
When bound to atoms and molecules, quantum mechanics causes electrons to naturally assume a set of distinct energy levels. Some of these correspond to photons of different energies, including radio frequencies. A passing photon can cause the electron to move between two of the atom's energy levels, if the photon is close to the energy difference in those levels. In metals, the energy levels are so closely spaced that the electrons in them will respond to almost any radio frequency photon, which is why metals are excellent materials for use in antennas. The same is true for free electrons, but in this case, there are no inherent energy levels at all and the electrons will react to almost any photon.

=== In fireballs ===
Within a nuclear fireball, the air is ionized, consisting of a mixture of nuclei and free electrons. The latter so strongly refract radio waves that it forms a mirror-like surface when the electron density is above a critical value. As the fireball radiates away energy and cools, the ions and electrons re-form back into atoms and the effect slowly fades over a period of seconds or minutes. Even as it cools the cloud attenuates signals, perhaps to the point to make it useless for radar use.

Total reflection from the fireball occurs when the radio frequency is less than the plasma frequency:

$f_p = 8970 N_e^\frac{1}{2}$ Hz

where $N_e$ is the number of free electrons per cubic centimeter. For a 1 m wavelength (300 MHz) signal this occurs when the density is 10^{9} free electrons per cubic centimeter. Even at very low densities the ionization will refract radio energy. Attenuation occurs via electron collisions with neutrals according to:

$F_a = \frac{8.686 }{2c}\frac{(2 \pi f_p)^2 f_c}{(2 \pi f)^2+ f_c^2}= 1.4$ × $10^{-5}\frac{(2 \pi f_p)^2 f_c}{(2 \pi f)^2+ f_c^2}$ decibels/km

where 8.686 is the conversion factor to a decibel power ratio from a neper amplitude ratio, $c$ is the speed of light in kilometers per second, $f_p$ is the plasma frequency as above, $f$ is the frequency of the radio signal, and $f_c$ is the electron-neutral collision frequency. The latter is a function of the density, and thus the altitude:

$f_c = 2$ × $10^{11} \frac{p}{p_0}$ Hz

where $p$ is the air density at the explosion altitude, and $p_0$ is the density at sea level (1 atm). Since the fireball can expand to hundreds of kilometers at high altitude, this means that a typical attenuation of 1 dB per kilometer through a fireball at mid to high-altitudes which expands to 10 km will completely attenuate the signal, making tracking objects on the far side impossible.

=== Outside the atmosphere ===
The effects of the exoatmospheric beta release are more difficult to assess because much depends on the geometry of the burst. However, it is possible to determine the density of the fission products, and thus relationship between the size of the ionization disk and its strength, by considering the yield of products for an explosion of $Y$ in megatons:

$y = \frac{Y}{2 \pi d^2}$ tons/unit area

where $d$ is the diameter of the disk for a given explosion.

== Blackout lifetime ==
When the explosion takes place within the atmosphere, the fireball rapidly forms and initially gives off considerable energy in the form of visible and UV light. This rapidly cools the fireball to about 5000 °C, at which point the cooling process slows considerably. From then on the primary cooling effect is through thermal transfer with the surrounding air mass. This process takes as long as several minutes, and as there is less air at higher altitudes, the fireball remains ionized for longer periods.

At higher altitudes, from 100,000 to 200,000 feet (30–60 km), the density of air is not enough to be a significant effect, and the fireball continues to cool radiatively. Generally the process is described by a radiative recombination constant, $C_r$, which is about 10^{−12} cubic centimeters per second. If the initial electron density is 10^{12}, a density of 10^{9} electrons/cm^{2} will not occur until 1,000 seconds, about 17 minutes.

For purely exoatmospheric explosions, the betas causing the blackout disk are continually produced by the fission events in the bomb debris. This is subject to the half-life of the reactions, on the order of seconds. In order to maintain a blackout, one needs to satisfy the equation:

$y t^{-1.2} > 10^{-2}$

To create a complete blackout, with 10^{9} free electrons per cubic centimeter, requires about 10 tons of fission products per square kilometer. This can be achieved with a single typical 1 Mt bomb.

== Blackout and missile defense ==
Blackout is a special concern in missile defense systems, where the effect can be used to defeat ground-based radars by producing large opaque areas behind which approaching warheads cannot be seen. Depending on the reaction time of the interceptors, this may render them useless as the approaching warheads re-appear too late for the interceptor to develop a track and fire its missile.

For short-range interceptors like Sprint, blackout is not a serious concern because the entire interception takes place at ranges and altitudes below where the fireballs grow large enough to block a significant area of the sky. At the Sprint's nominal range of 45 kilometres (28 mi), its own few-kiloton warhead would produce a fireball perhaps 1 kilometre (3,000 ft) across, which represents an angle of (1 km/45 km)^{2} ≈ 0.0005 steradians (sr). At the same altitude, a 1 Mt explosion would create a fireball on the order of 10 kilometres (6 mi) across, or about 0.05 sr, still not a serious concern.

Only an attack consisting of a few dozen large warheads would be significant enough to cause a short range interceptor to have a problem. But so would the interceptor missile warheads if they were exploded near each other, which would be typical because it was "necessary to fire more than one defensive missile at each incoming dangerous object... [to] ensure a high enough probability of [a] kill." Such issues were explored in the 1962 Operation Dominic test series. The conclusion from these tests was that the only solution to such an attack profile would be to use multiple radar systems netting them together, and selecting whichever one has the clearest view of the targets. This would greatly increase the expense of an ABM system, as the radars were among the most expensive components of systems like Nike-X.

Against longer-ranged missiles like Spartan, these same high-altitude explosions represented a more serious problem. In this case, the missile was expected to be carrying out interceptions at ranges as great as 500 kilometres (300 mi), a distance that took some time to reach. A single explosion outside the atmosphere could blanket the area with a disk as great as 400 kilometres (250 mi) across at an altitude of about 60 kilometres (40 mi). A warhead appearing from behind this signal would be too close for the Spartan to attack it with its X-ray warhead, which relied on the explosion taking place outside the atmosphere. The defense would either have to deal with the follow-up warheads with their short-range weapons like Sprint, or attack every approaching warhead at long range in case it might be part of such a blackout attack. Sophisticated attacks with multiple blackout explosions were a topic of some concern.

There is a direct relationship between the wavelength of the radar and the size of the antenna needed to provide a given resolution. This means there is an advantage to using higher frequencies for search radars, as they will be able to resolve a given sized object, like a warhead or booster fragments, from a smaller antenna. However, it is generally less expensive to generate radio power at lower frequencies, offsetting the disadvantage in resolution by allowing the construction of more powerful radars. The tradeoff between these two effects requires careful optimization.

Radar blackout further confuses these issues. Inherent to the formula above is the fact that higher frequencies are blacked out for shorter times. This suggests long-range radars should use as high a frequency as possible, although this is more difficult and expensive. The US PAR was initially designed to operate in the VHF region to allow it to be extremely powerful while also relatively low-cost, but during the design stage, it moved to the UHF region to help mitigate this effect. Even then, it would be heavily attenuated.

This means that exoatmospheric explosions are very effective against long-range early-warning radars like PAR or the Soviet Dnestr. A single 1 Mt warhead detonated at 250 km altitude would be about 600 kilometres (400 mi) downrange given typical trajectories, and might be expected to create an ionization disk 300 kilometres (200 mi) across. As seen from the radar, this would be an angle of (300 km/600 km)^{2} ≈ 0.3 sr, enough to hide any warheads approaching along similar paths. This would allow, for instance, a single warhead from a particular missile field to hide all the following ones from the same field. Although this would not affect the operation of the interceptors directly, being outside the range of even the very long-range Spartan, such operations could seriously upset raid direction and overall battle planning. Moreover, because the explosion takes place outside the range of the interceptors, there is no simple means of stopping it.

== Considerable uncertainty ==
While the formulas above are likely useful for back-of-the-envelope discussions, it needs to be considered that little actual testing of these effects was carried out due to various test bans. Over the history of US testing, only seven tests with the appropriate instrumentation took place in the upper atmosphere altitudes of 10 to 25 kilometres (33,000–82,000 ft) that would be appropriate for late-stage blackout, and only two were tested at exoatmospheric altitudes. None of these tests contained multiple bursts, which would be expected from any attack deliberately creating blackout.
