= Scheme-theoretic intersection =

In algebraic geometry, the scheme-theoretic intersection of closed subschemes X, Y of a scheme W is $X \times_W Y$, the fiber product of the closed immersions $X \hookrightarrow W, Y \hookrightarrow W$. It is denoted by $X \cap Y$.

Locally, W is given as $\operatorname{Spec} R$ for some ring R and X, Y as $\operatorname{Spec}(R/I), \operatorname{Spec}(R/J)$ for some ideals I, J. Thus, locally, the intersection $X \cap Y$ is given as

$$\operatorname{Spec}(R/(I+J)).$$

Here, we used $R/I \otimes_R R/J \simeq R/(I + J)$ (for this identity, see tensor product of modules#Examples.)

Example: Let $X \subset \mathbb{P}^n$ be a projective variety with the homogeneous coordinate ring S/I, where S is a polynomial ring. If $H = \{ f = 0 \} \subset \mathbb{P}^n$ is a hypersurface defined by some homogeneous polynomial f in S, then

$$X \cap H = \operatorname{Proj}(S/(I, f)).$$

If f is linear (deg = 1), it is called a hyperplane section. See also: Bertini's theorem.

Now, a scheme-theoretic intersection may not be a correct intersection, say, from the point of view of intersection theory. For example, let $W = \operatorname{Spec}(k[x, y, z, w])$ be the affine 4-space and X, Y closed subschemes defined by the ideals $(x, y) \cap (z, w)$ and $(x - z, y - w)$. Since X is the union of two planes, each intersecting with Y at the origin with multiplicity one, by the linearity of intersection multiplicity, we expect X and Y intersect at the origin with multiplicity two. On the other hand, one sees the scheme-theoretic intersection $X \cap Y$ consists of the origin with multiplicity three. That is, a scheme-theoretic multiplicity of an intersection may differ from an intersection-theoretic multiplicity, the latter given by Serre's Tor formula. Solving this disparity is one of the starting points for derived algebraic geometry, which aims to introduce the notion of derived intersection.

== Proper intersection ==
Let X be a regular scheme and V, W closed integral subschemes. Then an irreducible component P of $V \cap W := V \times_X W$ is called proper if the inequality (due to Serre):

$$\operatorname{codim}(P, X) \le \operatorname{codim}(V, X) + \operatorname{codim}(W, X)$$

is an equality. The intersection $V \cap W$ is proper if every irreducible component of it is proper (in particular, the empty intersection is considered proper.) Two algebraic cycles are said to intersect properly if the varieties in the cycles intersect properly.

For example, two divisors (codimension-one cycles) on a smooth variety intersect properly if and only if they share no common irreducible component. Chow's moving lemma (on a smooth variety) says that an intersection can be made proper after replacing a divisor by a suitable linearly equivalent divisor (cf. Kleiman's theorem.)

Serre's inequality above may fail in general for a non-regular ambient scheme. For example, let $X = \operatorname{Spec} k[x, y, z, w]/(xz - yw), \, V = V(\overline{x}, \overline{y}), \, W = V(\overline{z}, \overline{w})$. Then $V, W$ have codimension one, while $V \cap W$ has codimension three.

Some authors such as Bloch define a proper intersection without assuming X is regular: in the notations as above, a component P is proper if

$$\operatorname{codim}(P, X) \ge \operatorname{codim}(V, X) + \operatorname{codim}(W, X).$$

== See also ==
- complete intersection
- Gysin homomorphism
