= Lefschetz pencil =

Construction in algebraic geometry

In mathematics, a Lefschetz pencil is a construction in algebraic geometry considered by Solomon Lefschetz, used to analyse the algebraic topology of an algebraic variety $V$.

== Description ==
A pencil is a particular kind of linear system of divisors on $V$, namely a one-parameter family, parametrised by the projective line. This means that in the case of a complex algebraic variety $V$, a Lefschetz pencil is something like a fibration over the Riemann sphere; but with two qualifications about singularity.

The first point comes up if we assume that $V$ is given as a projective variety, and the divisors on $V$ are hyperplane sections. Suppose given hyperplanes $H$ and $H'$, spanning the pencil — in other words, $H$ is given by $L=0$ and $H'$ by $L'=0$ for linear forms $L$ and $L'$, and the general hyperplane section is $V$ intersected with

$$\lambda L + \mu L^\prime = 0.\$$

Then the intersection $J$ of $H$ with $H'$; has codimension two. There is a rational mapping

$$V \rightarrow P^1\ :\ p\mapsto \left[ L'(p):-L(p) \right]$$

which is in fact well-defined only outside the points on the intersection of $J$ with $V$. To make a well-defined mapping, some blowing up must be applied to $V$.

The second point is that the fibers may themselves 'degenerate' and acquire singular points (where Bertini's lemma applies, the general hyperplane section will be smooth). A Lefschetz pencil restricts the nature of the acquired singularities, so that the topology may be analysed by the vanishing cycle method. The fibres with singularities are required to have a unique quadratic singularity, only.

It has been shown that Lefschetz pencils exist in characteristic zero. They apply in ways similar to, but more complicated than, Morse functions on smooth manifolds. It has also been shown that Lefschetz pencils exist in characteristic p for the étale topology.

Simon Donaldson has found a role for Lefschetz pencils in symplectic topology, leading to more recent research interest in them.

== See also ==
- Picard–Lefschetz theory
