= Complete intersection =

Term in mathematics

In mathematics, an algebraic variety V in projective space is a complete intersection if the ideal of V is generated by exactly codim V elements. That is, if V has dimension m and lies in projective space P^{n}, there should exist n − m homogeneous polynomials:

$$F_i(X_0,\cdots,X_n), 1\leq i\leq n - m,$$

in the homogeneous coordinates X_{j}, which generate all other homogeneous polynomials that vanish on V.

Geometrically, each F_{i} defines a hypersurface; the intersection of these hypersurfaces should be V. The intersection of n − m hypersurfaces will always have dimension at least m, assuming that the field of scalars is an algebraically closed field such as the complex numbers. The question is essentially, can we get the dimension down to m, with no extra points in the intersection? This condition is fairly hard to check as soon as the codimension n − m ≥ 2. When n − m = 1 then V is automatically a hypersurface and there is nothing to prove.

== Examples ==
Easy examples of complete intersections are given by hypersurfaces which are defined by the vanishing locus of a single polynomial. For example,

$$\mathbb{V}(x_0^5 + \cdots + x_4^5) = \text{Proj}\left(\frac{\mathbb{F}[x_0,\ldots,x_4]}{(x_0^5 + \cdots + x_4^5)}\right) \xrightarrow{i} \mathbb{P}^4_\mathbb{F}$$

gives an example of a quintic threefold. It can be difficult to find explicit examples of complete intersections of higher dimensional varieties using two or more explicit examples (bestiary), but, there is an explicit example of a 3-fold of type $(2,4)$ given by

$$\mathbb{V}(x_0^2 + x_1^2 + x_2^2 + x_3^2 + x_4x_5, x_4^4 + x_5^4 - 2x_0x_1x_2x_3).$$

== Non-examples ==
=== Twisted cubic ===
One method for constructing local complete intersections is to take a projective complete intersection variety and embed it into a higher dimensional projective space. A classic example of this is the twisted cubic in $\mathbb{P}_R^3$: it is a smooth local complete intersection meaning in any chart it can be expressed as the vanishing locus of two polynomials, but globally it is expressed by the vanishing locus of more than two polynomials. We can construct it using the very ample line bundle $\mathcal{O}(3)$ over $\mathbb{P}^1$ giving the embedding (Veronese map)

$\mathbb{P}_R^1 \to \mathbb{P}_R^3$ by $[s:t] \mapsto [s^3:s^2t:st^2:t^3].$

Note that $\Gamma(\mathcal{O}(3)) = \text{Span}_R\{s^3,s^2t,st^2,t^3 \}$. If we let $\mathbb{P}^3_R = \text{Proj}(R[x_0,x_1,x_2,x_3])$ the embedding gives the following relations:

$$\begin{align}
f_1 &= x_0x_3 - x_1x_2 \\
f_2 &= x_1^2 - x_0x_2 \\
f_3 &= x_2^2 - x_1x_3.
\end{align}$$

Hence the twisted cubic is the projective scheme

$$\text{Proj}\left( \frac{R[x_0,x_1,x_2,x_3]}{(f_1,f_2,f_3)} \right).$$

=== Union of varieties differing in dimension ===
Another convenient way to construct a non complete intersection, which can never be a local complete intersection, is by taking the union of two different varieties where their dimensions do not agree. For example, the union of a line and a plane intersecting at a point is a classic example of this phenomenon. It is given by the scheme

$$\text{Spec}\left( \frac{\mathbb{C}[x,y,z]}{(xz,yz)} \right).$$

== Multidegree ==
A complete intersection has a multidegree, written as the tuple (properly though a multiset) of the degrees of defining hypersurfaces. For example, taking quadrics in $\mathbb{P}^3$ again, (2,2) is the multidegree of the complete intersection of two of them, which when they are in general position is an elliptic curve. The Hodge numbers of complex smooth complete intersections were worked out by Kunihiko Kodaira.

== General position ==
For more refined questions, the nature of the intersection has to be addressed more closely. The hypersurfaces may be required to satisfy a transversality condition (like their tangent spaces being in general position at intersection points). The intersection may be scheme-theoretic, in other words here the homogeneous ideal generated by the F_{i}(X_{0}, ..., X_{n}) may be required to be the defining ideal of V, and not just have the correct radical. In commutative algebra, the complete intersection condition is translated into regular sequence terms, allowing the definition of local complete intersection, or after some localization an ideal has defining regular sequences.

== Topology ==
=== Homology ===
Since complete intersections of dimension $n$ in $\mathbb{CP}^{n+m}$ are the intersection of hyperplane sections, we can use the Lefschetz hyperplane theorem to deduce that

$$H^{j}(X) = \mathbb{Z}$$

for $j < n$. In addition, it can be checked that the homology groups are always torsion-free using the universal coefficient theorem. This implies that the middle homology group is determined by the Euler characteristic of the space.

=== Euler characteristic ===
Hirzebruch gave a generating function computing the dimension of all complete intersections of multi-degree $(a_1,\ldots,a_r)$. It reads

$$\sum_{n=0}^\infty \chi(X_n(a_1,\ldots,a_r))z^n = \frac{a_1 \cdots a_r}{(1-z)^2}\prod_{i=1}^r \frac{1}{(1 + (a_i - 1)z)}.$$
