= Solomon Lefschetz =

Russian-born American mathematician (1884–1972)

Solomon Lefschetz ForMemRS
- Born: 3 September 1884; Moscow, Russian Empire
- Died: 5 October 1972 (aged 88); Princeton, New Jersey, U.S.
- Citizenship: United States
- Education: École Centrale Paris; Clark University
- Known for: Lefschetz fixed-point theorem Picard–Lefschetz theory Lefschetz connection Lefschetz hyperplane theorem Lefschetz duality Lefschetz manifold Lefschetz number Lefschetz principle Lefschetz zeta function Lefschetz pencil Lefschetz theorem on (1,1)-classes
- Awards: Bôcher Memorial Prize (1924); National Medal of Science (1964); Leroy P. Steele Prize (1970); Fellow of the Royal Society
- Scientific career
- Fields: Algebraic topology
- Workplaces: University of Nebraska; University of Kansas; Princeton University; National Autonomous University of Mexico; Brown University
- Thesis: On the Existence of Loci with Given Singularities (1911)
- Doctoral advisor: William Edward Story
- Doctoral students: Edward Begle; Richard Bellman; Felix Browder; Clifford Dowker; George F. D. Duff; Ralph Fox; Ralph Gomory; John McCarthy; Robert Prim; Paul A. Smith; Norman Earl Steenrod; Arthur Harold Stone; Clifford Truesdell; Albert W. Tucker; John Tukey; Henry Wallman; Shaun Wylie
- Other notable students: Sylvia de Neymet

Solomon Lefschetz ForMemRS (Russian: Соломо́н Ле́фшец; 3 September 1884 – 5 October 1972) was a Russian-born American mathematician who did fundamental work on algebraic topology, its applications to algebraic geometry, and the theory of non-linear ordinary differential equations.

== Life ==
He was born in Moscow, the son of Alexander Lefschetz and his wife Sarah or Vera Lifschitz, both Russian-Jewish traders who used to travel around Europe and the Middle East (since they held Ottoman passports). Thereafter, the family moved to Paris and he was educated there in engineering at the École Centrale Paris but emigrated to the US in 1905.

He was badly injured in an industrial accident in 1907, losing both hands. He moved towards mathematics, receiving a Ph.D. in algebraic geometry from Clark University in Worcester, Massachusetts in 1911. He then took positions at the University of Nebraska and University of Kansas, moving to Princeton University in 1924, where he was soon given a permanent position. He remained there until 1953.

In the application of topology to algebraic geometry, he followed the work of Charles Émile Picard, whom he had heard lecture in Paris at the École Centrale Paris. He proved theorems on the topology of hyperplane sections of algebraic varieties, which provide a basic inductive tool (these are now seen as allied to Morse theory, though a Lefschetz pencil of hyperplane sections is a more subtle system than a Morse function because hyperplanes intersect each other). The Picard–Lefschetz formula in the theory of vanishing cycles is a basic tool relating the degeneration of families of varieties with 'loss' of topology, to monodromy. He was an Invited Speaker of the ICM in 1920 in Strasbourg. His book L'analysis situs et la géométrie algébrique from 1924, though opaque foundationally given the current technical state of homology theory, was in the long term very influential (one could say that it was one of the sources for the eventual proof of the Weil conjectures, through SGA 7 also for the study of Picard groups of Zariski surface). In 1924 he was awarded the Bôcher Memorial Prize for his work in mathematical analysis. He was elected to the United States National Academy of Sciences in 1925 and the American Philosophical Society in 1929.

The Lefschetz fixed-point theorem, now a basic result of topology, was developed by him in papers from 1923 to 1927, initially for manifolds. Later, with the rise of cohomology theory in the 1930s, he contributed to the intersection number approach (that is, in cohomological terms, the ring structure) via the cup product and duality on manifolds. His work on topology was summed up in his monograph Algebraic Topology (1942). From 1944 he worked on differential equations.

He was editor of the Annals of Mathematics from 1928 to 1958. During this time, the Annals became an increasingly well-known and respected journal, and Lefschetz played an important role in this.

In 1945 he travelled to Mexico for the first time, where he joined the Institute of Mathematics at the National University of Mexico as a visiting professor. He visited frequently for long periods, and during 1953–1966 he spent most of his winters in Mexico City. He played an important role in the foundation of mathematics in Mexico, and sent several students back to Princeton. His students included Emilio Lluis, José Adem, Samuel Gitler, Santiago López de Medrano, Francisco Javier González-Acuña and Alberto Verjovsky.

Lefschetz came out of retirement in 1958, because of the launch of Sputnik, to augment the mathematical component of Glenn L. Martin Company's Research Institute for Advanced Studies (RIAS) in Baltimore, Maryland. His team became the world's largest group of mathematicians devoted to research in nonlinear differential equations. The RIAS mathematics group stimulated the growth of nonlinear differential equations through conferences and publications. He left RIAS in 1964 to form the Lefschetz Center for Dynamical Systems at Brown University, Providence, Rhode Island.

== Selected works ==
- L´Analysis situs et la géométrie algébrique, Paris, Gauthier-Villars 1924
- Intersections and transformations of complexes and manifolds, Transactions of the American Mathematical Society vol. 28, 1926, pp. 1–49, online; fixed-point theorem, published in vol. 29, 1927, pp. 429–462, online.
- Géométrie sur les surfaces et les variétés algébriques, Paris, Gauthier Villars 1929
- Topology, AMS 1930
- Algebraic Topology, New York, American Mathematical Society 1942
- Introduction to topology, Princeton 1949
- with Joseph P. LaSalle, Stability by Liapunov's direct method with applications, New York, Academic Press 1961
- Algebraic geometry, Princeton 1953, 2nd edn., 1964
- Differential equations: geometric theory, Interscience, 1957, 2nd edn., 1963
- Stability of nonlinear control systems, 1965
- Reminiscences of a mathematical immigrant in the United States, American Mathematical Monthly, vol.77, 1970, pp. 344–350.
