= Serre's inequality on height =

In algebra, specifically in the theory of commutative rings, Serre's inequality on height states: given a (Noetherian) regular ring A and a pair of prime ideals $\mathfrak{p}, \mathfrak{q}$ in it, for each prime ideal $\mathfrak r$ that is a minimal prime ideal over the sum $\mathfrak p + \mathfrak q$, the following inequality on heights holds:

$$\operatorname{ht}(\mathfrak r) \le \operatorname{ht}(\mathfrak p) + \operatorname{ht}(\mathfrak q).$$

Without the assumption on regularity, the inequality can fail; see scheme-theoretic intersection#Proper intersection.

== Sketch of Proof ==
Serre gives the following proof of the inequality, based on the validity of Serre's multiplicity conjectures for formal power series ring over a complete discrete valuation ring.

By replacing $A$ by the localization at $\mathfrak r$, we assume $(A, \mathfrak r)$ is a local ring. Then the inequality is equivalent to the following inequality: for finite $A$-modules $M, N$ such that $M \otimes_A N$ has finite length,

$$\dim_A M + \dim_A N \le \dim A$$

where $\dim_A M = \dim(A/\operatorname{Ann}_A(M))$ = the dimension of the support of $M$ and similar for $\dim_A N$. To show the above inequality, we can assume $A$ is complete. Then by Cohen's structure theorem, we can write $A = A_1/a_1 A_1$ where $A_1$ is a formal power series ring over a complete discrete valuation ring and $a_1$ is a nonzero element in $A_1$. Now, an argument with the Tor spectral sequence shows that $\chi^{A_1}(M, N) = 0$. Then one of Serre's conjectures says $\dim_{A_1} M + \dim_{A_1} N < \dim A_1$, which in turn gives the asserted inequality. $\square$
