= Picard–Lefschetz theory =

Study of the topology of a complex manifold

In mathematics, Picard–Lefschetz theory studies the topology of a complex manifold by looking at the critical points of a holomorphic function on the manifold. It was introduced by Émile Picard for complex surfaces in his book Picard & Simart (1897), and extended to higher dimensions by Solomon Lefschetz (1924). It is a complex analog of Morse theory, which studies the topology of a real manifold by looking at the critical points of a real function. Pierre Deligne and Nicholas Katz (1973) extended Picard–Lefschetz theory to varieties over more general fields, and Deligne used this generalization in his proof of the Weil conjectures.

== Picard–Lefschetz formula ==
The Picard–Lefschetz formula describes the monodromy at a critical point.

Suppose that f is a holomorphic map from an $(k+1)$-dimensional projective complex manifold to the projective line P^{1}. Also suppose that all critical points of f are non-degenerate and have distinct images x_{1},...,x_{n} in P^{1}. Pick any other point x in P^{1}. The fundamental group π_{1}(P^{1} – {x_{1}, ..., x_{n}}, x) — which is the free group F_{n-1} on n-1 generators — is generated by loops w_{i} going around the points x_{i}, and to each point x_{i} there is a vanishing cycle in the homology H_{k}(Y_{x}) of the fiber Y_{x} = f^{-1}(x) at x. Note that this is the middle homology since the fibre has complex dimension k, hence real dimension 2k. The monodromy action of π_{1}(P^{1} – {x_{1}, ..., x_{n}}, x) on H_{k}(Y_{x}) is described as follows by the Picard–Lefschetz formula. (The action of monodromy on other homology groups is trivial.) The monodromy action of a generator w_{i} of the fundamental group on γ ∈ H_{k}(Y_{x}) is given by

$$w_i(\gamma) = \gamma+(-1)^{(k+1)(k+2)/2}\langle \gamma,\delta_i\rangle \delta_i$$

where δ_{i} is the vanishing cycle of x_{i}. This formula appears implicitly for k = 2 (without the explicit coefficients of the vanishing cycles δ_{i}) in Picard & Simart (1897, p.95). Lefschetz (1924, chapters II, V) gave the explicit formula in all dimensions.

== Example ==
Consider the projective family of hyperelliptic curves of genus $g$ defined by

$$y^2 = (x-t)(x-a_1)\cdots(x-a_k)$$

where $t \in \mathbb{A}^1$ is the parameter and $k=2g+1$. Then, this family has double-point degenerations whenever $t = a_i$. Since the curve is a connected sum of $g$ tori, the intersection form on $H_1$ of a generic curve is the matrix

$$\begin{bmatrix}
0 & 1 \\
1 & 0
\end{bmatrix}^{\oplus g}
= \begin{bmatrix}
0 & 1 & 0 & 0 & \cdots & 0 & 0 \\
1 & 0 & 0 & 0 & \cdots & 0 & 0 \\
0 & 0 & 0 & 1 & \cdots & 0 & 0 \\
0 & 0 & 1 & 0 & \cdots & 0 & 0\\
\vdots & \vdots & \vdots & \vdots & \ddots & \vdots & \vdots \\
0 & 0 & 0 & 0 & \cdots & 0 & 1 \\
0 & 0 & 0 & 0 & \cdots & 1 & 0
\end{bmatrix}$$

we can easily compute the Picard-Lefschetz formula around a degeneration on $\mathbb{A}^1_t$. Suppose that $\gamma, \delta$ are the $1$-cycles from the $j$-th torus. Then, the Picard-Lefschetz formula reads

$$w_j(\gamma) = \gamma - \delta$$

if the $j$-th torus contains the vanishing cycle. Otherwise it is the identity map.

== See also ==
- Lefschetz pencil
