= Prim–Read theory =

Prim–Read theory, or Prim–Read defense, was an important development in game theory that led to radical changes in the United States' views on the value of anti-ballistic missile (ABM) systems. The theory assigns a certain cost to deploying defensive missiles and suggests a way to maximize their value in terms of the amount of damage they could reduce. By comparing the cost of various deployments, one can determine the relative amount of money needed to provide a defense against a certain number of ICBMs.

The theory was first introduced in the late 1950s and might have been lost to history had it not been picked up during the debate on the Nike-X ABM. Nike-X called for the deployment of a heavy defensive system around major US cities with the intent of seriously blunting the effect of any Soviet strike. A number of operations researchers, notably US Air Force General Glenn Kent, used Prim–Read to conclusively demonstrate that the cost of reducing damage back to a given level was always more than the cost of causing additional damage by building more ICBMs.

The outcome of these studies suggested that any US deployment of an ABM system would result in the USSR building a small number of additional missiles to defeat it. Assuming the Soviets would come to the same conclusion, Robert McNamara became highly critical of any large-scale ABM system, and began efforts that would ultimately lead to the ABM treaty in 1972. The underlying concept became known as the cost-exchange ratio.

== History ==
=== Nike Zeus ===
The US Army began studying the anti-ballistic missile in a serious fashion in 1955. Working with Bell Labs, who had delivered the successful Nike and Nike B surface-to-air missiles (SAM), they began by considering what was essentially a direct update of the Nike concepts to the ABM mission. Bell returned a report suggesting that minor upgrades to the Hercules missile, along with much more powerful radars and computers, would do the trick. This was initially known as Nike II, but renamed Nike Zeus in 1956.

Early in the Zeus effort the US Air Force attempted to derail the project by pointing out that if Zeus cost the same as an ICBM, and the Soviets were building them as quickly as Nikita Khrushchev claimed, then the Soviets would simply build a few more to "soak up" any Zeus' the Army deployed. But in fact, it seemed the ICBMs were actually cheaper than Zeus, perhaps significantly, which meant the US would lose the resulting arms race. This basic concept became known as the cost exchange ratio.

President Eisenhower's Secretary of Defense Neil McElroy identified the Air Force complaints as an example of sour grapes, having lost funding for their own ABM efforts, Project Wizard, in favor of Zeus. But the math appeared to be correct, so he asked for a second opinion from the President's Science Advisory Committee (PSAC). They largely agreed with the Air Force's take, and then added several additional concerns of their own.

By the late 1950s, several new problems became evident. One was that the newly discovered nuclear blackout effect would allow an enemy to blanket an area hundreds of miles wide with a radar-opaque layer for the cost of one warhead. This would render Zeus blind to anything above the layer; following warheads would not become visible under the cloud until they were too close to impact for the Zeus to fly up to them. Another issue was the addition of decoys to the ICBMs, which presented radar targets that looked the same as the warhead. These cleared away due to drag as they reentered the atmosphere, but once again, this occurred at too low an altitude to attack.

=== Nike-X ===
At the suggestion of ARPA, the Army responded by redesigning the system as Nike-X. Nike-X used a short-range but extremely high-speed interceptor known as Sprint that was optimized for interceptions under 60 kilometres (200,000 ft) and combined that with an extremely high-speed radar and computer system. The plan was to wait until the warhead cleared any blackout and the decoys were slowing, allowing the radar to pick out the warhead and attack it with the Sprint. The entire engagement would last only a few seconds.

The Army produced a study that considered a real deployment scenario and then estimated the number of lives it would save. They started by assuming that the Soviets would want to launch two warheads at every target, to ensure at least one would go off. In order to confuse the defense, they would add nine credible decoys to each ICBM. This would present each base with 20 radar targets in total. For the same redundancy reasons, the Army would launch two Sprint missiles at each target, so a total of 40 Sprints would be needed to protect every target. Given the relative costs of the Sprint and an ICBM, the Army demonstrated that the Sprint system would save a considerable number of civilian lives for less than the cost of an ICBM.

=== Last-move problem ===
When this was presented as a part of a PSAC study of the Nike-X system, one member of the group immediately noted a problem. Air Force Brigadier General Glenn Kent had been taught to always consider who had the last move in any plan, and in this case, he concluded that the Soviets had that advantage. Facing a Nike-X deployment, they could change their ICBM targets without the US having any idea what those were.

For instance, one response would be to ignore the defended targets entirely, and use the missiles to attack the next cities on their target list. Since those targets would be smaller, they could be assigned one missile each. Although this would increase the number of targets that were not destroyed due to warhead failures, the total number of targets hit would be greater.

Another solution would be to ignore targets further down the list and reassign those warheads to ones further up the list, ensuring the defenses at those targets would be overwhelmed through sheer numbers. Although the targets further down the list would no longer be attacked, they had smaller populations so their value was less.

In either case, the attacker could once again cause enormous damage without spending a single extra dollar on the attack. Worse, the US has no idea which strategy the Soviets picked, and therefore would have no idea how to respond. The question, then, was how does one plan a defensive layout when there is no clear answer what the enemy's response will be?

When Kent pointed this issue out to Director of Defense Research and Engineering (DDR&E) Harold Brown, Brown immediately grasped the problem and recalled the Army group to explain why their analysis was essentially useless. He then tasked Kent with coming up with a way to analyze the problem that would not be dependent on knowing the Soviet attack allocations.

=== Prim–Read ===
Kent learned that two researchers at Bell Labs had considered this exact issue in a 1957 paper. Robert Prim and Thornton Read solved the problem by developing a simple mathematical formula that maximized the damage reduction in terms of any given expenditure on the defense. Prim visited Kent at the Pentagon to explain the idea, which was extremely simple in conceptual terms.

The basic idea was a reflection of the targeting priorities the Soviets would use. Against "soft targets" like cities, a single warhead will effectively destroy it, so launching additional warheads at the same target will not cause a corresponding doubling of damage inflicted. However, the missiles have a certain probability of successfully reaching the target and detonating, the probability of kill, or P_{k}. If the P_{k} is 50%, for instance, the Soviets will want to launch more than one ICBM at a target to increase the chances of destroying it. Two warheads improve this to 75%, and three to 87.5%. However, in the case that the first one does work the following two are wasted, and would be better spent on other targets. They have to balance the desire to guarantee destruction of certain targets with the knowledge that other targets would then be skipped entirely.

The Prim–Read concept used the same basic logic but applied it to the chance of successfully destroying an enemy missile. For instance, if a city is expecting to be attacked by two warheads, then its chance of being destroyed is 75%. Assigning a single interceptor to defend that city means one of the two warheads will be shot down 50% of the time. This means the chance of not getting hit is now 50%, a 25% improvement. Critically, adding a second interceptor means a 50% of hitting either, a 75% chance of hitting both. The chance you hit the one that would go off is 50-50, so now the chance the target does not get hit is 62.5%. Thus, adding the second interceptor only improves the survival rate by 12.5%.

The key point is that instead of applying the second interceptor to improve the survival rate of that target 12.5%, it might be better to instead put that interceptor over some other target that formerly had no protection, and improve its survival rate by 50%. Of course, this requires one to put a value of some sort on the targets so one can calculate if 50% of one target is worth more than 12.5% of another.

Consider a real-world example in which New York is considered to have twice the "value" of Los Angeles. In this case, a naive arrangement would be to assign twice as many interceptors to New York. However, due to the P_{k} considerations, this does not provide twice the defensive capability, but a fractional addition. In the case of large numbers of interceptors and enemy warheads, additional missiles may provide only a tiny benefit. In contrast, assigning those missiles to Los Angeles may dramatically improve its survival if it otherwise had only a few. Improving Los Angeles' survival by 25% is likely "better" than improving New York's by 12.5%.

The paper goes on to explain how to arrange the overall deployment. Each target is assigned a worth, W, and the price of the defense assigned to protect it is P. The ratio of W to P is λ. If one were to assign a single missile to all potential targets, then the list of resulting λ values would mirror the W values.

If λ is less than 1, that means the cost of defense is more than the worth of the target. In this case, that target's missile is much better off being assigned to another target, and the best one to pick is the one with the highest λ. When that happens, the λ of that target drops because more P is being spent on it. As a result, another target becomes the highest on the list of λ. One then continues this process of reassigning missiles until the resulting list of targets that are protected have the same λ, or as close to that as possible. λ, in effect, represents the overall damage percent you are willing to accept.

One can make real-world calculations by selecting the population of the urban area to be a proxy for W. In this case New York has the highest W and initial λ, and it is naturally assigned the largest number of defensive interceptors. One might be inclined to move a missile from Los Angeles to New York to offer higher protection, but the brilliance of Prim–Read is that demonstrates that while doing so would improve New York's survival rate a tiny bit, it would lower Los Angeles' even more.

One outcome of the Prim–Read deployment is that it is based entirely on the number of ABMs constructed and the total worth of the targets they protect. It does not matter what the Soviet response to the deployment is; if they choose to reduce the number of missiles assigned to one target to ensure they penetrate the defenses of another, that will always increase the overall survival rate of the defenders. It is possible for the Soviets to overwhelm the entire system, but even in that case the Prim–Read deployment will reduce whatever damage will be caused by the maximal amount possible.

=== Prim–Read becomes notorious ===
With Prim–Read, one can construct a mathematically maximal defense for any given expenditure. Because that defense is probabilistic, it means that it assumes some damage even when the defense is overwhelming, and at the same time it means there will be some reduction in damage even if the attack is overwhelming. The question then becomes whether or not the amount of damage reduction desired can be achieved for a reasonable total expenditure, given various estimates of the Soviet fleet.

Kent began developing Prim–Read deployments of various numbers of ABMs to determine their effectiveness against various numbers of ICBMs. The results were clear. Limited amounts of protection could be offered with small expenditures even if the Soviets built huge numbers of ICBMs; by pure chance, some of the targets would not be hit and ABMs would improve those numbers. The opposite was also true; if the US built an enormous fleet of ABMs, some enemy warheads would still hit their targets purely by chance.

If one wanted to save 90% of the US population, one required huge numbers of ABMs, and the relative cost of the defense compared to the offense was about 1.7 times. In other words, if the Soviets spent $10 billion producing ICBMs in a given year, the US would have to spend $17 billion on ABMs. However, when they found the official exchange rate between the US Dollar and Ruble was a fiction, and the actual value was very different, the ratio inflated to 6-to-1. In this sort of regime, the USSR could easily afford to build enough missiles to overwhelm any defense the US could afford.

Kent presented his results to Brown, who began to have serious questions about any sort of active defense. While this had no immediate effect on Nike-X planning, this was all taking place while another group was forming to consider the entire issue of the nuclear age under the direction of Frank Trinkl, part of Alain Enthoven's group at RAND. Kent was put into the group and noted that of the twenty items they had been tasked to consider, eight of those were purely defensive and he suggested grouping them together under the topic of damage limitation. Trinkl disagreed, and when Kent continued to pester him about it, Trinkl fired him from the group.

Brown then tasked Kent with going ahead and considering the eight issues in his own report, and this time assigned members of the Joint Chiefs of Staff to help. The report, on the topic of "damage limitation", immediately caught the eye of Robert McNamara who "bought it lock, stock, and barrel." McNamara put his feelings on the matter succinctly, stating to Kent that "At 70 percent surviving, you say 70 percent surviving, General, that sounds pretty good. Do you know what our detractors will say? 'Only 60 million dead.'"

From that point on, McNamara was against any sort of large scale Nike-X deployment, and the system was ultimately canceled. The basic concept, which became known as the cost-exchange ratio, ultimately ended any large-scale ABM deployment in the United States, and led directly to the 1972 ABM Treaty. This did not end well for Kent, who was blamed for this situation, with one detractor stating "There’s the man that was the genesis of the ABM Treaty, the worst of our greatest strategic disasters, the ABM Treaty of 1972."
