= Family of curves =

Set of curves from a function with variable parameter(s)

The Apollonian circles, two orthogonal families of circles

In geometry, a family of curves is a set of curves, each of which is given by a function or parametrization in which one or more of the parameters is variable. In general, the parameter(s) influence the shape of the curve in a way that is more complicated than a simple linear transformation. Sets of curves given by an implicit relation may also represent families of curves.

Families of curves appear frequently in solutions of differential equations; when an additive constant of integration is introduced, it will usually be manipulated algebraically until it no longer represents a simple linear transformation.

Families of curves may also arise in other areas. For example, all non-degenerate conic sections can be represented using a single polar equation with one parameter, the eccentricity of the curve:

$$r(\theta) = {l \over 1+e \cos \theta}$$

as the value of e changes, the appearance of the curve varies in a relatively complicated way.

== Applications ==
Families of curves may arise in various topics in geometry, including the envelope of a set of curves and the caustic of a given curve.

In machine learning, neural networks are families of curves with parameters chosen by an optimization algorithm e.g. to minimize the value of a loss function on a given training dataset.

== Generalizations ==
In algebraic geometry, an algebraic generalization is given by the notion of a linear system of divisors.
