= Kleiman's theorem =

In algebraic geometry, Kleiman's theorem, introduced by Kleiman (1974), concerns dimension and smoothness of scheme-theoretic intersection after some perturbation of factors in the intersection.

Precisely, it states: given a connected algebraic group G acting transitively on an algebraic variety X over an algebraically closed field k and $V_i \to X, i = 1, 2$ morphisms of varieties, G contains a nonempty open subset such that for each g in the set,

1. either $gV_1 \times_X V_2$ is empty or has pure dimension $\dim V_1 + \dim V_2 - \dim X$, where $g V_1$ is $V_1 \to X \overset{g}\to X$,
2. (Kleiman–Bertini theorem) If $V_i$ are smooth varieties and if the characteristic of the base field k is zero, then $gV_1 \times_X V_2$ is smooth.

Statement 1 establishes a version of Chow's moving lemma: after some perturbation of cycles on X, their intersection has expected dimension.

== Sketch of proof ==
We write $f_i$ for $V_i \to X$. Let $h: G \times V_1 \to X$ be the composition that is $(1_G, f_1): G \times V_1 \to G \times X$ followed by the group action $\sigma: G \times X \to X$.

Let $\Gamma = (G \times V_1) \times_X V_2$ be the fiber product of $h$ and $f_2: V_2 \to X$; its set of closed points is

$$\Gamma = \{ (g, v, w) | g \in G, v \in V_1, w \in V_2, g \cdot f_1(v) = f_2(w) \}$$.

We want to compute the dimension of $\Gamma$. Let $p: \Gamma \to V_1 \times V_2$ be the projection. It is surjective since $G$ acts transitively on X. Each fiber of p is a coset of stabilizers on X and so

$$\dim \Gamma = \dim V_1 + \dim V_2 + \dim G - \dim X$$.

Consider the projection $q: \Gamma \to G$; the fiber of q over g is $g V_1 \times_X V_2$ and has the expected dimension unless empty. This completes the proof of Statement 1.

For Statement 2, since G acts transitively on X and the smooth locus of X is nonempty (by characteristic zero), X itself is smooth. Since G is smooth, each geometric fiber of p is smooth and thus $p_0 : \Gamma_0 := (G \times V_{1, \text{sm}}) \times_X V_{2, \text{sm}} \to V_{1, \text{sm}} \times V_{2, \text{sm}}$ is a smooth morphism. It follows that a general fiber of $q_0 : \Gamma_0 \to G$ is smooth by generic smoothness. $\square$
