= Bundle of principal parts =

In algebraic geometry, given a line bundle L on a smooth variety X, the bundle of n-th order principal parts of L is a vector bundle of rank $\tbinom{n+\text{dim}(X)}{n}$ that, roughly, parametrizes n-th order Taylor expansions of sections of L.

Precisely, let I be the ideal sheaf defining the diagonal embedding $X \hookrightarrow X \times X$ and $p, q: V(I^{n+1}) \to X$ the restrictions of projections $X \times X \to X$ to $V(I^{n+1}) \subset X \times X$. Then the bundle of n-th order principal parts is

$$P^n(L) = p_* q^* L.$$

Then $P^0(L) = L$ and there is a natural exact sequence of vector bundles

$$0 \to \mathrm{Sym}^n(\Omega_X) \otimes L \to P^n(L) \to P^{n-1}(L) \to 0.$$

where $\Omega_X$ is the sheaf of differential one-forms on X.

== See also ==
- Linear system of divisors (bundles of principal parts can be used to study the osculating (as in osculating plane) behaviors of a linear system.)
- Jet (mathematics) (a closely related notion)
