= Nike-X =

Anti-ballistic missile system

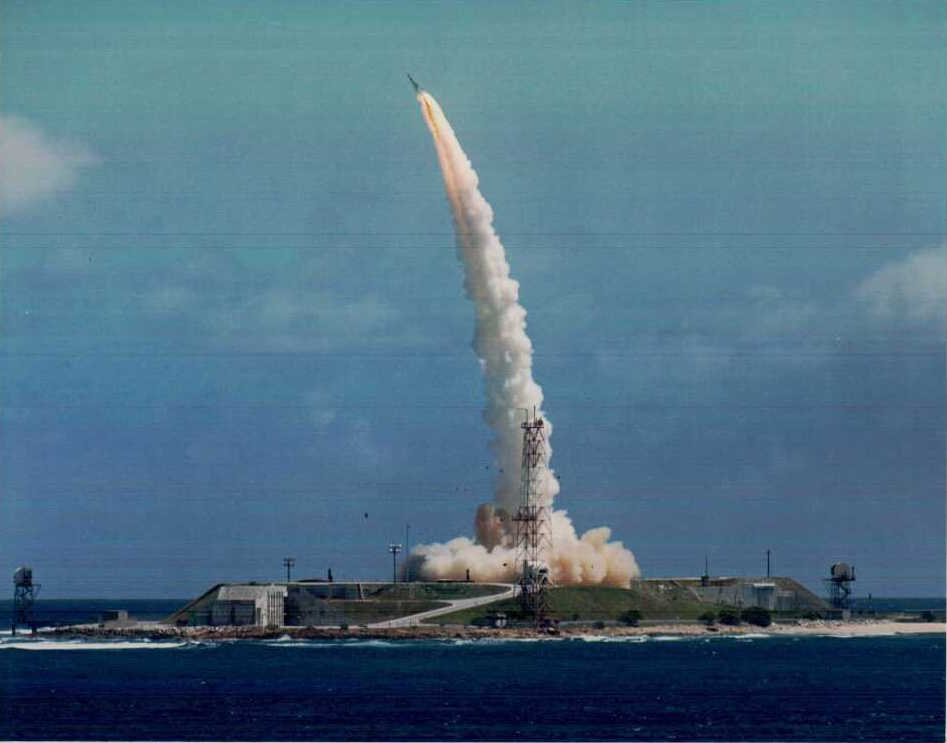
The Sprint missile was the main weapon in the Nike-X system, intercepting enemy ICBM warheads only seconds before they exploded.

Nike-X was an anti-ballistic missile (ABM) system designed in the 1960s by the United States Army to protect major cities in the United States from attacks by the Soviet Union's intercontinental ballistic missile (ICBM) fleet during the Cold War. The X in the name referred to its experimental basis and was supposed to be replaced by a more appropriate name when the system was put into production. This never came to pass; in 1967 the Nike-X program was canceled and replaced by a much lighter defense system known as Sentinel.

The Nike-X system was developed in response to limitations of the earlier Nike Zeus system. Zeus' radars could only track single targets, and it was calculated that a salvo of only four ICBMs would have a 90% chance of hitting a Zeus base. The attacker could also use radar reflectors or high-altitude nuclear explosions to obscure the warheads until they were too close to attack, making a single-warhead attack highly likely to succeed. Zeus would have been useful in the late 1950s when the Soviets had only a few dozen missiles, but would be of little use by the early 1960s when it was believed they would have hundreds.

The key concept that led to Nike-X was that the rapidly thickening atmosphere below 60 kilometers (37 mi) altitude disrupted the reflectors and explosions. Nike-X intended to wait until the enemy warheads descended below this altitude and then attack them using a very fast missile known as Sprint. The entire engagement would last only a few seconds and could take place as low as 25,000 feet (7,600 m). To provide the needed speed and accuracy, as well as deal with multi-warhead attacks, Nike-X used a new radar system and building-filling computers that could track hundreds of objects at once and control salvos of many Sprints. Many dozens of warheads would need to arrive at the same time to overwhelm the system.

Building a complete deployment would have been extremely expensive, on the order of half the total yearly budget of the Department of Defense. Robert McNamara, the Secretary of Defense, believed that the cost could not be justified and worried it would lead to a further nuclear arms race. He directed the teams to consider deployments where a limited number of interceptors might still be militarily useful. Among these, the I-67 concept suggested building a lightweight defense against very limited attacks. When the People's Republic of China exploded their first H-bomb in June 1967, I-67 was promoted as a defense against a Chinese attack, and this system became Sentinel in October. Nike-X development, in its original form, ended.

Although ultimately cancelled, testing performed during Nike-X and earlier Nike Zeus programs would prove vital for later ballistic missile protection programs such as Safeguard, the Ballistic Missile Defense Organization, the Strategic Defense Initiative, and the current Missile Defense Agency.

== History ==
=== Nike Zeus ===
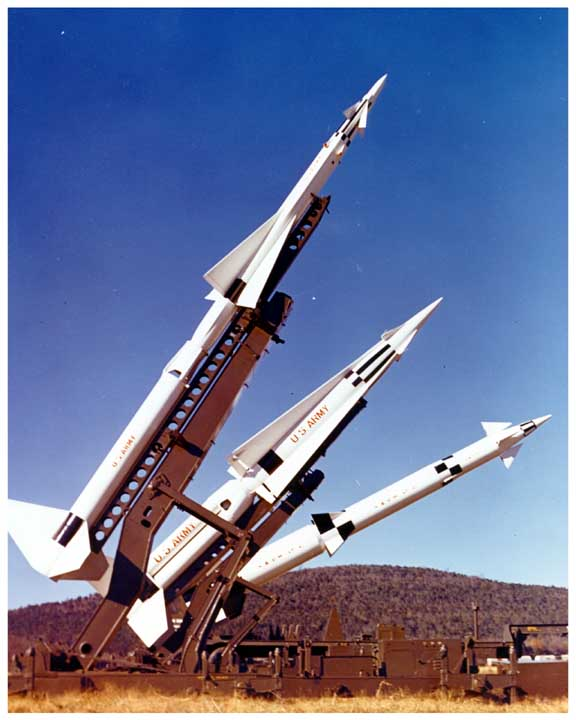
The Nike missile family included Ajax (front), Hercules (middle), and Zeus (rear).

In 1955 the US Army began considering the possibility of further upgrading their Nike B surface-to-air missile (SAM) as an anti-ballistic missile to intercept ICBMs. Bell Labs, the primary contractor for Nike, was asked to study the issue. Bell returned a report stating that the missile could be upgraded to the required performance relatively easily, but the system would need extremely powerful radar systems to detect the warhead while it was still far enough away to give the missile time to launch. All of this appeared to be within the state of the art, and in early 1957 Bell was given the go-ahead to develop what was then known as Nike II. Considerable interservice rivalry between the Army and Air Force led to the Nike II being redefined and delayed several times. These barriers were swept aside in late 1957 after the launch of the R-7 Semyorka, the first Soviet ICBM. The design was further upgraded, given the name Zeus, and assigned the highest development priority.

Zeus was similar to the two Nike SAM designs that preceded it. It used a long-range search radar to pick up targets, separate radars to track the target and interceptor missiles in flight, and a computer to calculate intercept points. The missile itself was much larger than earlier designs, with a range of up to 200 miles (320 km), compared to Hercules' 75 miles (121 km). To ensure a kill at 100,000 feet (30 km) altitude, where there was little atmosphere to carry a shock wave, it mounted a 400 kiloton (kT) warhead. The search radar was a rotating triangle 120 feet (37 m) wide, able to pick out warheads while still over 600 nautical miles (1,100 km) away, an especially difficult problem given the small size of a typical warhead. A new transistorized digital computer offered the performance needed to calculate trajectories for intercepts against warheads traveling over 5 miles per second (8.0 km/s; Mach 24).

The Zeus missile began testing in 1959 at White Sands Missile Range (WSMR) and early launches were generally successful. Longer range testing took place at Naval Air Station Point Mugu, firing out over the Pacific Ocean. For full-scale tests, the Army built an entire Zeus base on Kwajalein Island in the Pacific, where it could be tested against ICBMs launched from Vandenberg Air Force Base in California. Test firings at Kwajalein began in June 1962; these were very successful, passing within hundreds of yards of the target warheads, and in some tests, low-flying satellites.

=== Zeus problems ===
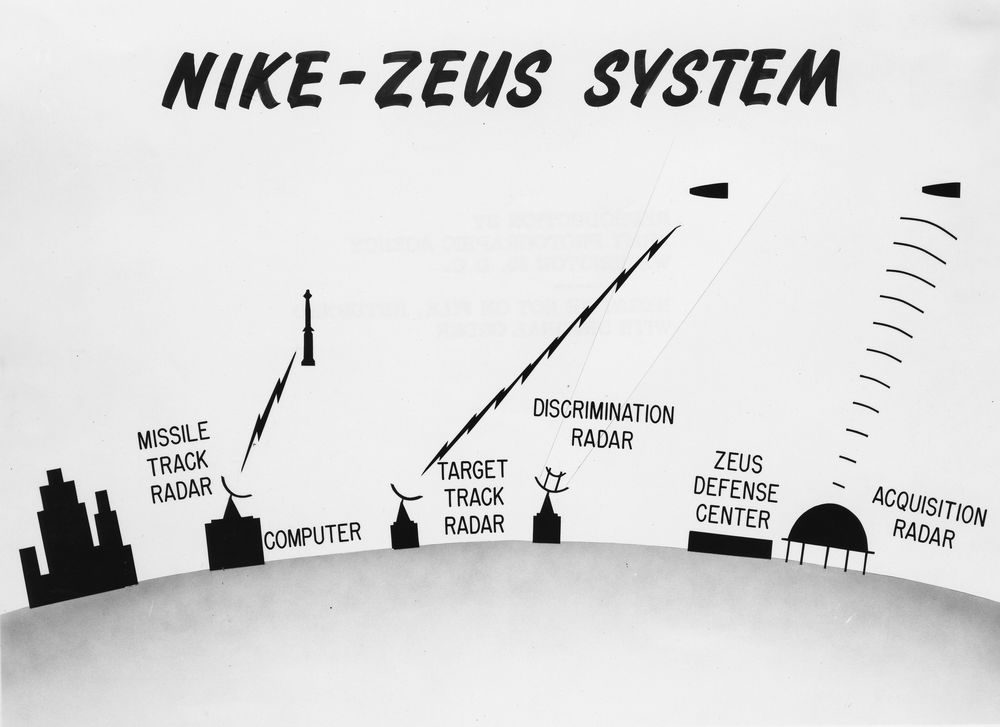
The Zeus system required two separate radars for each missile it launched, with extras for redundancy and others for early detection and discrimination.

Zeus had initially been proposed in an era when ICBMs were extremely expensive and the US believed that the Soviet fleet contained a few dozen missiles. At a time when the US deterrent fleet was based entirely on crewed bombers, even a small number of missiles aimed at Strategic Air Command's (SAC) bases presented a serious threat. Two Zeus deployment plans were outlined. One was a heavy defensive system that would provide protection over the entire continental United States, but require as many as 7000 Zeus missiles. McNamara supported a much lighter system that would use only 1200 missiles.

Technological improvements in warheads and missiles in the late 1950s greatly reduced the cost of ICBMs. After the launch of Sputnik, Pravda quoted Nikita Khrushchev claiming they were building them "like sausages". This led to a series of intelligence estimates that predicted the Soviets would have hundreds of missiles by the early 1960s, creating the so-called "missile gap". It was later shown that the number of Soviet missiles did not reach the hundreds until the late 1960s, and at the time they had only four.

Zeus used mechanically steered radars, like the Nike SAMs before it, limiting the number of targets it could attack at once. A study by the Weapons Systems Evaluation Group (WSEG) calculated that the Soviets had a 90 percent chance of successfully hitting a Zeus base by firing only four warheads at it. These did not even have to land close in order to destroy the base; an explosion within several miles would destroy its radars, which were very difficult to harden. If the Soviets did have hundreds of missiles, they could easily afford to use some to attack the Zeus sites.

Additionally, technical problems arose that appeared to make the Zeus almost trivially easy to defeat. One problem, discovered in tests during 1958, was that nuclear fireballs expanded to very large sizes at high altitudes, rendering everything behind them invisible to radar. This was known as nuclear blackout. By the time an enemy warhead passed through the fireball, about 60 kilometers (37 mi) above the base, it would only be about eight seconds from impact. That was not enough time for the radar to lock on and fire a Zeus before the warhead hit its target.

It was also possible to deploy radar decoys to confuse the defense. Decoys are made of lightweight materials, often strips of aluminum or mylar balloons, which can be packed in with the reentry vehicle (RV), adding little weight. In space, these are ejected to create a threat tube a few kilometers across and tens of kilometers long. Zeus had to get within about 1,000 feet (300 m) to kill a warhead, which could be anywhere in the tube. The WSEG suggested that a single ICBM with decoys would almost certainly defeat Zeus. A mid-1961 staff report by ARPA suggested that a single large missile with multiple warheads would require four entire Zeus batteries, of 100 missiles each, to defeat it.

=== Nike-X ===
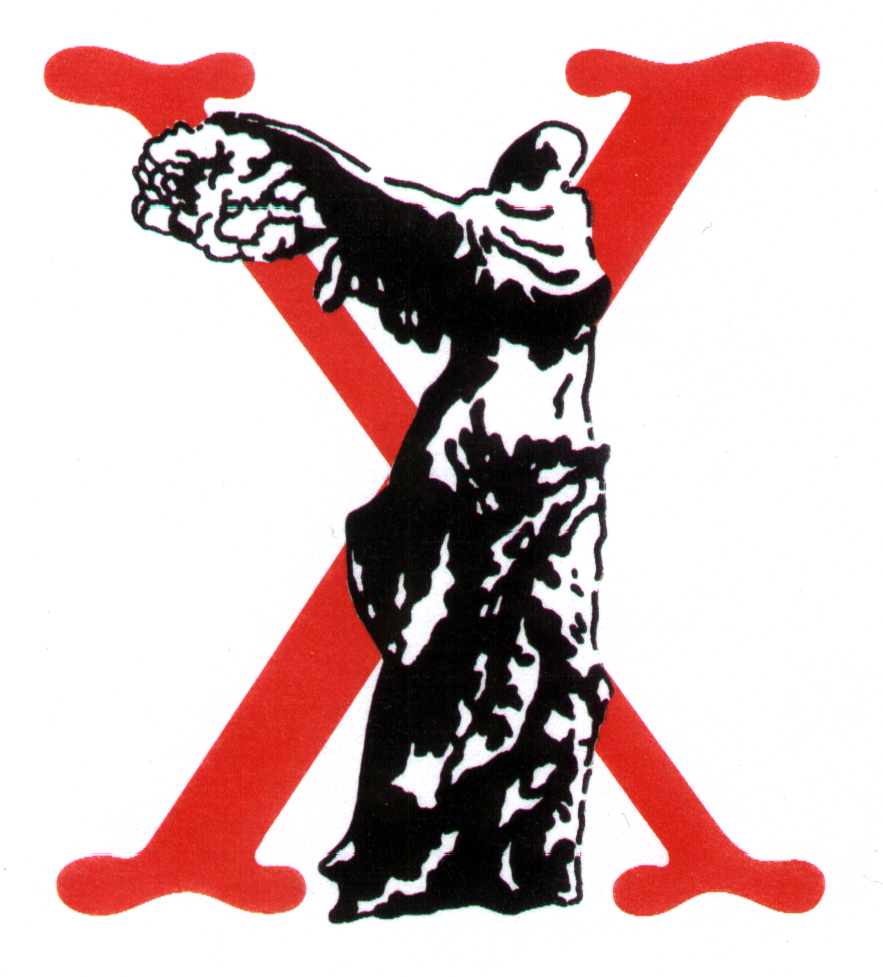
The Nike-X Project Office took over from Nike Zeus in 1964. The office's emblem features the statue of Nike of Samothrace, the Greek goddess of victory.

The Advanced Research Projects Agency (ARPA, today known as DARPA) was formed in 1958 by President Dwight Eisenhower's Secretary of Defense, Neil McElroy, in reaction to Soviet rocketry advances. US efforts had suffered from massive duplication of effort between the Army, Air Force, and Navy, and seemed to be accomplishing little in comparison to the Soviets. ARPA was initially handed the mission of overseeing all of these efforts. As the problems with Zeus became clear, McElroy also asked ARPA to consider the antimissile problem and come up with other solutions. The resulting Project Defender was extremely broad in scope, considering everything from minor Zeus system upgrades to far-out concepts like antigravity and the recently invented laser.

Meanwhile, one improvement to Zeus was already being studied: a new phased-array radar replacing Zeus' mechanical ones would greatly increase the number of targets and interceptors that a single site could handle. Much more powerful computers were needed to match this performance. Additionally, the antennas were mounted directly in concrete and would have increased blast resistance. Initial studies at Bell Labs started in 1960 on what was then known as the Zeus Multi-function Array Radar, or ZMAR. In June 1961, Western Electric and Sylvania were selected to build a prototype, with Sperry Rand Univac providing the control computer.

By late 1962 a decision on whether or not to deploy Zeus was looming. Bell began considering a replacement for the Zeus missile that would operate at much shorter ranges, and in October sent out study contracts to three contractors to be returned in February. Even before these were returned, in January 1963 McNamara announced that the construction funds allocated for Zeus would not be released, and the funding would instead be used for development of a new system using the latest technologies. The name Nike-X was apparently an ad hoc suggestion by Jack Ruina, the director of ARPA, who was tasked with presenting the options to the President's Science Advisory Committee (PSAC). With the ending of Zeus, the ZMAR radar effort was renamed MAR, and plans for an even more powerful version, MAR-II, became the central part of the Nike-X concept. (Note: There is considerable confusion in the Bell history about the meaning of the term "MAR-II". Early overview sections suggest this was an upgraded MAR, but later sections imply this was simply 'the second MAR'. See I-37 and 2-22, as well as the chart on 2-2 which has MAR-I and 'MAR' (lacking the II) as a follow-on design.)

=== System concept ===
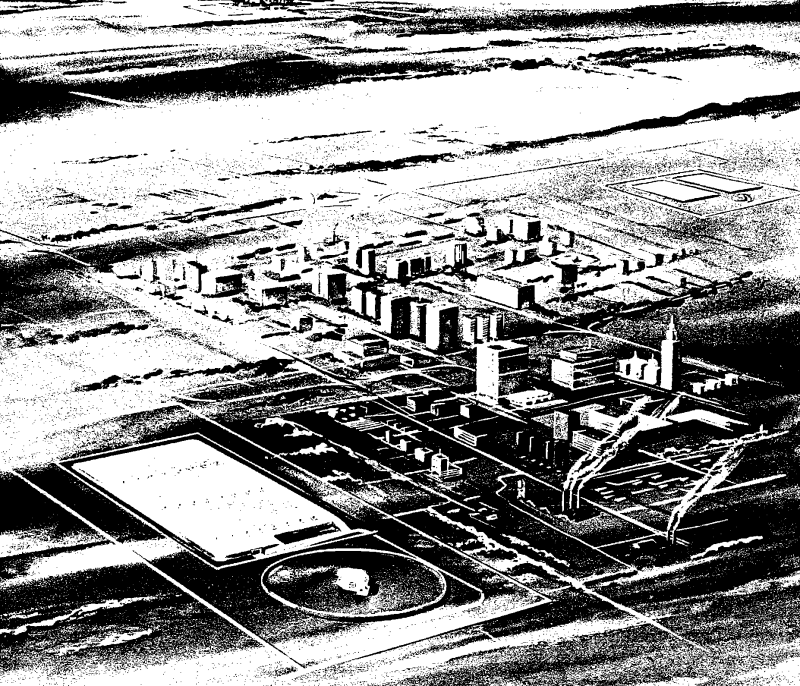
This image shows the arrangement of a typical Nike-X deployment. In the foreground is a missile site with a number of Sprint launchers and a two-sided MAR radar. In the background, upper right is a second base with additional missiles and an MSR radar.

Decoys are lighter than the RV, (Note: Ten lightweight decoys are about the weight of a single warhead. As warhead weights began to decrease in the late 1950s, existing missiles had leftover capacity that could be filled with decoys.) and therefore suffer higher atmospheric drag as they begin to reenter the atmosphere. This will eventually cause the RV to move out in front of the decoys. The RV can often be picked out earlier by examining the threat tube and watching for objects that have lower deceleration. This process, known as atmospheric filtering, or more generally, decluttering, will not provide accurate information until the threat tube begins to reenter the denser portions of the atmosphere, at altitudes around 60 kilometers (37 mi). Nike-X intended to wait until the decluttering was complete, meaning the interceptions would take place only seconds before the warheads hit their targets, between 5 and 30 miles (8.0–48.3 km) away from the base.

Low-altitude intercepts would also have the advantage of reducing the problem with nuclear blackout. The lower edge of the extended fireball used to induce this effect extended down to about 60 km, the same altitude at which decluttering became effective. Hence, low-altitude intercepts meant that deliberate attempts to create a blackout would not affect the tracking and guidance of the Sprint missile. Just as importantly, because the Sprint's own warheads would be going off far below this altitude, their fireballs would be much smaller and would only black out a small portion of the sky. The radar would have to survive the electrical effects of EMP, and significant effort was expended on this. It also meant that the threat tube trajectories would have to be calculated rapidly, before or between blackout periods, and the final tracking of the warheads in the 10 seconds or so between clearing the clutter and hitting their targets. This demanded a very high-performance computer, one that did not exist at that time.

The centerpiece of the Nike-X system was MAR, using the then-new active electronically scanned array (AESA) concept to allow it to generate multiple virtual radar beams, simulating any number of mechanical radars needed. While one beam scanned the sky for new targets, others were formed to examine the threat tubes and generate high-quality tracking information very early in the engagement. More beams were formed to track the RVs once they had been picked out, and still more to track the Sprints on their way to the interceptions. To make all of this work, MAR required data processing capabilities on an unprecedented level, so Bell proposed building the system using the newly invented resistor–transistor logic small-scale integrated circuits. Nike-X centralized the battle control systems at their Defense Centers, consisting of a MAR and its associated underground Defense Center Data Processing System (DCDPS).

Because the Sprint was designed to operate at short range, a single base could not provide protection to a typical US city, given urban sprawl. This required the Sprint launchers to be distributed around the defended area. Because a Sprint launched from a remote base might not be visible to the MAR during the initial stages of the launch, Bell proposed building a much simpler radar at most launch sites, the Missile Site Radar (MSR). MSR would have just enough power and logic to generate tracks for its outgoing Sprint missiles and would hand that information off to the DCDPS using conventional telephone lines and modems. Bell noted that the MSR could also provide a useful second-angle look at threat tubes, which might allow the decoys to be picked out earlier. Used as radio receivers, they could also triangulate any radio broadcasts coming from the threat tube, which the enemy might use as a radar jammer.

When the system was first being proposed it was not clear whether the phased-array systems could provide the accuracy needed to guide the missiles to a successful interception at very long ranges. Early concepts retained Zeus Missile Tracking Radars and Target Tracking Radars (MTRs and TTRs) for this purpose. In the end, the MAR proved more than capable of the required resolution, and the additional radars were dropped.

=== Problems and decision not to deploy ===
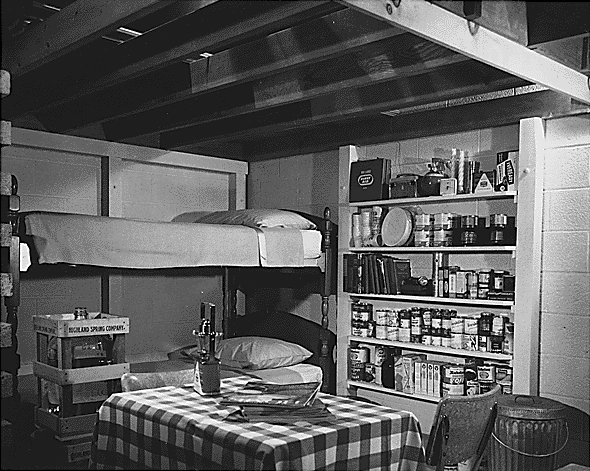
Calculations repeatedly showed that simple fallout shelters like this one would save many more civilians than an active defense like Nike-X, and for far less money.

Nike-X had been defined in the early 1960s as a system to defend US cities and industrial centers against a heavy Soviet attack during the 1970s. By 1965 the growing fleets of ICBMs in the inventories of both the US and USSR were making the cost of such a system very expensive. NIE 11-8-63, published 18 October 1963, estimated the Soviets would have 400–700 ICBMs deployed by 1969, and their deployment eventually reached 1,601 launchers, limited by the SALT agreements.

While Nike-X could be expected to attack these with a reasonable 1 to 1 exchange ratio, compared to Zeus' 20 to 1, it could only do so over a limited area. Most nationwide deployment scenarios contained thousands of Sprint missiles protecting only the largest US cities. The final projected cost of such a system was $30 - $40 billion to build ($421 billion in 2025, about half the annual military budget).

This led to further studies of the system to try to determine whether an ABM would be the proper way to save lives, or if there was some other plan that would do the same for less money. In the case of Zeus, for instance, it was clear that building more fallout shelters would be less expensive and save more lives. A major report on the topic by PSAC in October 1961 made this point, suggesting that Zeus without shelters was useless, and that having Zeus might lead the US to "introduce dangerously misleading assumptions concerning the ability of the US to protect its cities".

This led to a series of increasingly sophisticated models to better predict the effectiveness of an ABM system and what the opposition would do to improve their performance against it. A key development was the Prim-Read theory, which provided an entirely mathematical solution to generating the ideal defensive layout. Using a Prim-Read layout for Nike-X, Air Force Brigadier General Glenn Kent began considering Soviet responses. His 1964 report produced a cost-exchange ratio that required $2 of defense for every $1 of offense if one wanted to limit US casualties to 30 percent of the population. The cost increased to 6-to-1 if the US wished to limit casualties to 10 percent. ABMs would only be cheaper than ICBMs if the US was willing to allow over half its population to die in the exchange. When he realized he was using outdated exchange rates for the Soviet rouble, the exchange ratio for the 30 percent casualty rate jumped to 20-to-1.

As the cost of defeating Nike-X by building more ICBMs was less than the cost of building Nike-X to counter them, reviewers concluded that the construction of an ABM system would simply prompt the Soviets to build more ICBMs. This led to serious concerns about a new arms race, which it was believed would increase the chance of an accidental war. When the numbers were presented to McNamara, according to Kent:

[He] observed that this was a race that we probably would not win and should avoid. He noted that it would be difficult indeed to stay the course with a strategy that aimed to limit the damage. The detractors would proclaim that, with 70 percent surviving, there would be upwards of 60 million dead.

Despite its technical capabilities, Nike-X still shared one seemingly intractable problem that had first been noticed with Zeus. Facing an ABM system, the Soviets would change their targeting priorities to maximize damage, by attacking smaller, undefended cities for instance. As one DoD official put it at the time:

It was a very expensive terminal defense system which for a given amount of money could provide protection to some number of cities, but leaving many totally unprotected, and it suffered the flaw of any terminal defense system - namely that every piece contributes to the cost by the enemy can choose where to attack and only a small part of the system can be brought to bear to counter such an attack.

Another solution for the Soviets was to drop their warheads just outside the range of the defensive missiles, upwind of the target. Ground bursts would throw enormous amounts of radioactive dust into the air, causing fallout that would be almost as deadly as a direct attack. This would make the ABM system essentially useless unless the cities were also extensively protected from fallout. Those same fallout shelters would save many lives on their own, to the point that the ABM seemed almost superfluous. While reporting to Congress on the issue in the spring of 1964, McNamara noted:

I personally will never recommend an anti-ICBM program unless a fallout program does accompany it. I believe that even if we do not have an anti-ICBM program, we nonetheless should proceed with the fallout shelter program.

=== Alternative deployments ===
Under any reasonable set of assumptions, even an advanced system like Nike-X offered only marginal protection and did so for huge costs. Around 1965, the ABM became what one historian calls a "technology in search of a mission". In early 1965, the Army launched a series of studies to find a mission concept that would lead to deployment.

==== Hardpoint and Hardsite ====
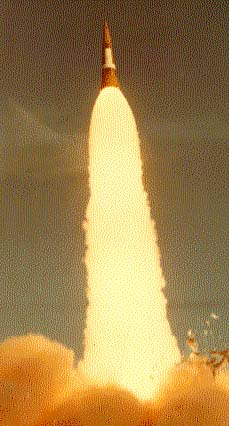
For even higher performance, the Hardsite concept replaced Sprint with HiBEX, which could accelerate at up to 400 g.

One of the original deployment plans for Zeus had been a defensive system for SAC. The Air Force argued against such a system, in favor of building more ICBMs of their own. Their logic was that every Soviet missile launched in a counterforce strike could destroy a single US missile. If both forces had similar numbers of missiles, such an attack would leave both forces with few remaining missiles to launch a counterstrike. Adding Zeus would reduce the number of losses on the US side, helping ensure a counterstrike force would survive. The same would be true if the US built more ICBMs instead. The Air Force was far more interested in building its own missiles than the Army's, especially in the case of Zeus, which appeared to be easily outwitted.

Things changed in the early 1960s when McNamara placed limits on the Air Force fleet of 1,000 Minuteman missiles and 54 Titan IIs. (Note: The Air Force had initially proposed building 10,000 Minuteman missiles.) This meant that the Air Force could not respond to new Soviet missiles by building more of their own. An even greater existential threat to Minuteman than Soviet missiles was the US Navy's Polaris missile fleet, whose invulnerability led to questions about the need for ground-based ICBMs. (Note: RAND published a paper on the topic known as "The Problem of Polaris", which outlined arguments the Air Force could use to counter this threat.) The Air Force responded by changing missions; the increasingly accurate Minuteman was now tasked with attacking Soviet missile silos, which the less accurate Navy missiles could not do. If the force was going to carry out this mission there had to be the expectation that enough missiles could survive a Soviet attack for a successful counterstrike. An ABM might provide that assurance.

A fresh look at this concept started at ARPA around 1963–64 under the name Hardpoint. This led to the construction of the Hardpoint Demonstration Array Radar, and an even faster missile concept known as HiBEX. This proved interesting enough for the Army and Air Force to collaborate on a follow-up study, Hardsite. The first Hardsite concept, HSD-I, considered the defending of bases within urban areas that would have Nike-X protection anyway. An example might be a SAC command and control center or an airfield on the outskirts of a city. The second study, HSD-II, considered the protection of isolated bases like missile fields. Most follow-up work focused on the HSD-II concept.

HSD-II proposed building small Sprint bases close to Minuteman fields. Incoming warheads would be tracked until the last possible moment, decluttering them completely and generating highly accurate tracks. Since the warheads had to land within a short distance of a missile silo to damage it, any warheads that could be seen to be falling outside that area were simply ignored – only those entering the "Site Protection Volume" needed to be attacked. At the time, Soviet inertial navigation systems (INS) were not particularly accurate. (Note: Table A.1 of Inventing Accuracy puts Soviet ICBMs of that era on the order of 1 nautical mile (1,900 m) CEP, compared to the Minuteman at 0.21 nautical miles (390 m).) This acted as a force multiplier, allowing a few Sprints to defend against many ICBMs.

Although initially supportive of the Hardsite concept, by 1966 the Air Force came to oppose it largely for the same reasons it had opposed Zeus in the same role. If money was to be spent on protecting Minuteman, they felt that money would be better spent by the Air Force than the Army. As Morton Halperin noted:

In part this was a reflex reaction, a desire not to have Air Force missiles protected by "Army" ABMs. ... The Air Force clearly preferred that the funds for missile defense be used by the Air Force to develop new hard rock silos or mobile systems.

==== Small City Defense, PAR ====
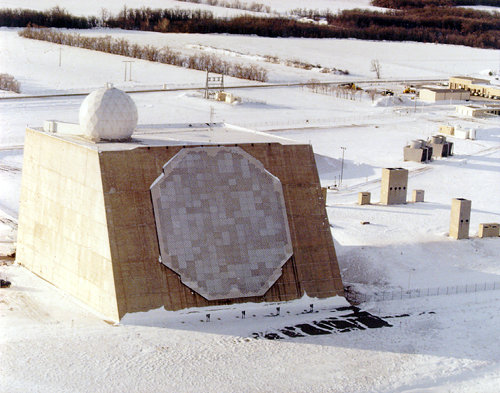
PARCS was originally designed to offer radar coverage over a large area, reducing the cost of the radars at each site in an SCD network.

During the project's development phase, the siting and size of the Nike-X bases became a major complaint of smaller cities. Originally intended to protect only the largest urban areas, Nike-X was designed to be built at a very large size with many missiles controlled by an expensive computer and radar network. Smaller sites were to be left undefended in the original Nike-X concept since the system was simply too expensive to build with only a few interceptors. These cities complained that they were not only being left open to attack, but that their lack of defenses might make them primary targets. This led to a series of studies on the Small City Defense (SCD) concept. By 1964 SCD had become part of the baseline Nike-X deployment plans, with every major city being provided some level of defensive system.

SCD would consist primarily of a single autonomous battery centered on a cut-down MAR called TACMAR (TACtical MAR), along with a simplified data processing system known as the Local Data Processor (LDP). This was essentially the DCDP with fewer modules installed, reducing the number of tracks it could compile and the amount of decluttering it could handle. To further reduce costs, Bell later replaced the cut-down MAR with an upgraded MSR, the "Autonomous MSR". They studied a wide variety of potential deployments, starting with systems like the original Nike-X proposal with no SCDs, to deployments offering complete continental US protection with many SCD modules of various types and sizes. The deployments were arranged so that they could be built in phases, working up to complete coverage.

One issue that emerged from these studies was the problem of providing early warning to the SCD sites. The SCD's MSR radars provided detection at perhaps 100 miles (160 km), which meant targets would appear on their radars only seconds before launches would have to be carried out. In a sneak attack scenario, there would not be enough time to receive command authority for the release of nuclear weapons. This meant the bases would require launch on warning authority, which was politically unacceptable.

This led to proposals for a new radar dedicated solely to the early warning role, determining only which MAR or SCD would ultimately have to deal with the threat. Used primarily in the first minutes of the attack, and not responsible for the engagements, the system could be considered disposable and did not need anything like the sophistication or hardening of the MAR. This led to the Perimeter Acquisition Radar (PAR), which would operate cheaper electronics at VHF frequencies.

==== X-ray attacks, Zeus EX ====
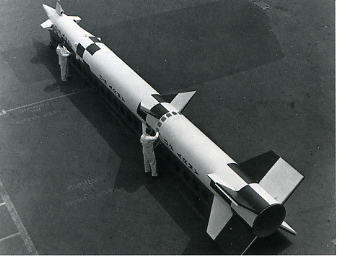
Zeus EX, later known as Spartan, was the ultimate development of the original Nike Zeus.

The high-altitude explosions that had caused so much concern for Nike Zeus due to blackout had been further studied in the early 1960s and led to a new possibility for missile defense. When a nuclear warhead explodes in a dense atmosphere, its initial high-energy X-rays ionize the air, blocking other X-rays. In the highest layers of the atmosphere, there is too little gas for this to occur, and the X-rays can travel long distances. Sufficient X-ray exposure to an RV can damage its heat shields.

In late 1964 Bell was considering the role of an X-ray-armed Zeus missile in the Nike-X system. A January 1965 report (Note: Bell says the first report on this was in December 1964.) outlines this possibility, noting that it would have to have a much larger warhead dedicated to the production of X-rays, and would have to operate at higher altitudes to maximize the effect. A major advantage was that accuracy needs were much reduced, from a minimum of about 800 feet (240 m) for the original Zeus' neutron-based attack, to something on the order of a few miles. This meant that the range limits of the original Zeus, which were defined by the accuracy of the radars to about 75 miles (121 km), were greatly eased. This, in turn, meant that a less sophisticated radar could be used, one with accuracy on the order of a mile rather than feet, which could be built much less expensively using VHF parts.

This Extended Range Nike Zeus, or Zeus EX for short, would be able to provide protection over a wider area, reducing the number of bases needed to provide full-country defense. (Note: The diagram on page 46 shows the much larger footprint of the Sentinel bases, which covered the better part of entire states. By the time this work was being prepared, Nike EX had been renamed Spartan.) Work on this concept continued throughout the 1960s, eventually becoming the primary weapon in the following Sentinel system, and in the modified Sentinel system that was later renamed Safeguard.

==== Nth Country, DEPEX, I-67 ====
In February 1965 the Army asked Bell to consider different deployment concepts under the Nth Country study. This examined what sort of system would be needed to provide protection against an unsophisticated attack with a limited number of warheads. Using Zeus EX, a few bases could provide coverage for the entire US. The system would be unable to deal with large numbers of warheads, but that was not a concern for a system that would only be tasked with beating off small attacks.

With only small numbers of targets, the full MAR was not needed and Bell initially proposed TACMAR to fill this need. This would have a shorter detection range, so a long range radar like PAR would be needed for early detection. The missile sites would consist of a single TACMAR along with about 20 Zeus EX missiles. In October 1965 the TACMAR was replaced by the upgraded MSR from the SCD studies. Since this radar had an even shorter range than TACMAR, it could not be expected to generate tracking information in time for a Zeus EX launch. PAR would thus have to be upgraded to have higher accuracy and the processing power to generate tracks that would be handed off to the MSRs. During this same time, Bell had noted problems with long wavelength radars in the presence of radar blackout. Both of these issues argued for a change from VHF to UHF frequencies for the PAR.

Further work along these lines led to the Nike-X Deployment Study, or DEPEX. DEPEX outlined a deployment that started out very similar to Nth Country, with a few bases primarily using Nike EX to provide lightweight cover, but which also included design features that allowed more bases to be added as the nature of the threat changed. The study described a four-phase deployment sequence that added more and more terminal defenses as the sophistication of the Nth Country missiles increased over time.

In December 1966, the Army asked Bell to prepare a detailed deployment concept combining the light defense of Nth Country with the point defense of Hardsite. On 17 January 1967, this became the I-67 project, which delivered its results on 5 July. I-67 was essentially Nth Country but with more bases near Minuteman fields, armed primarily with Sprint. The wide-area Zeus and short-range Sprint bases would both be supported by the PAR network.

=== Continued pressure to deploy ===
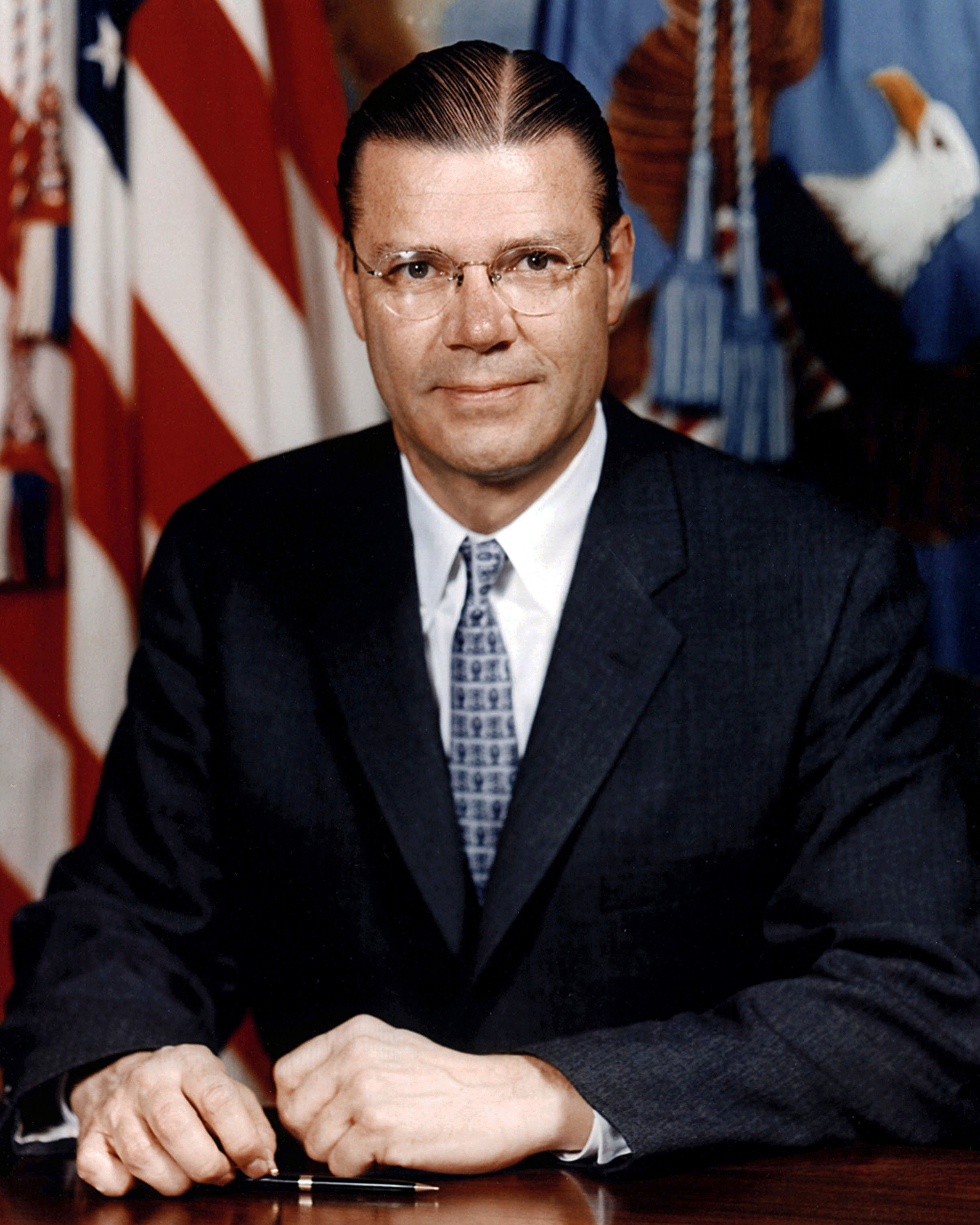
Robert McNamara had resisted pressure to deploy Zeus figuring it would have little real-world effect, and faced the same problem with Nike-X four years later.

The basic outlines of these various studies were becoming clear by 1966. The heavy defense from the original Nike-X proposals would cost about $40 billion ($397 billion in 2025) and offer limited protection and damage prevention in an all-out attack, but would be expected to blunt or completely defeat any smaller attack. The thin defense of Nth Country would be much less expensive, around $5 billion ($50 billion in 2025), but would only have any effect at all under certain limited scenarios. Finally, the Hardsite concepts would cost about the same as the thin defense, and provide some protection against a certain class of counterforce attacks.

None of these concepts appeared to be worth deploying, but there was considerable pressure from Congressional groups dominated by hawks who continued to force development of the ABM even when McNamara and President Johnson had not asked for it. The debate spilled over into the public and led to comments about an "ABM gap", especially by Republican Governor George W. Romney. The Air Force continued their opposition to the ABM concept, having previously criticized their earlier efforts in the press, but the construction of the A-35 ABM systems around Tallinn and Moscow overrode their opposition. The Joint Chiefs of Staff (JCS) used the Soviet ABM as an argument for deployment, having previously had no strong opinion on the matter.

McNamara attempted to short-circuit deployment in early 1966 by stating that the only program that had any reasonable cost-effectiveness was the thin defense against the Chinese, and then noted there was no rush to build such a system as it would be some time before they had an ICBM. Overruling him, Congress provided $167.9 million ($2 billion in 2025) for immediate production of the original Nike-X concept. McNamara and Johnson met on the issue on 3 November 1966, and McNamara once again convinced Johnson that the system could not justify the cost of deployment. McNamara headed off the expected counterattack from Romney by calling a press conference on the topic of Soviet ABMs and stating that the new Minuteman III and Poseidon SLBM would ensure the Soviet system would be overwhelmed.

Another meeting on the issue was called on 6 December 1966, attended by Johnson, McNamara, the deputy Secretary of Defense Cyrus Vance, Walt Rostow of the National Security Agency (NSA) and the Joint Chiefs. Rostow took the side of the JCS and it appeared that development would start. However, McNamara once again outlined the problems and stated that the simplest way to close the ABM gap was to simply build more ICBMs, rendering the Soviet system impotent and a great waste of money. He then proposed that the money sidelined by Congress for deployment be used for initial deployment studies while the US attempted to negotiate an arms limitation treaty. Johnson agreed with this compromise, and ordered Secretary of State Dean Rusk to open negotiations with the Soviets.

=== Nike-X becomes Sentinel ===
By 1967 the debate over ABM systems had become a major public policy issue, with almost continual debate on the topic in newspapers and magazines. It was in the midst of these debates, on 17 June 1967, that the Chinese tested their first H-bomb in Test No. 6. Suddenly the Nth Country concept was no longer simply theoretical. McNamara seized on this event as a way to deflect criticism over the lack of deployment while still keeping costs under control. On 18 September 1967, he announced that Nike-X would now be known as Sentinel, and outlined deployment plans broadly following the I-67 concept.

== Testing ==
Although the original Nike-X concept was canceled, some of its components were built and tested both as part of Nike-X and the follow-on Sentinel. MAR, MSR, Sprint and Spartan were the main programs during the Nike-X period.

=== MAR ===
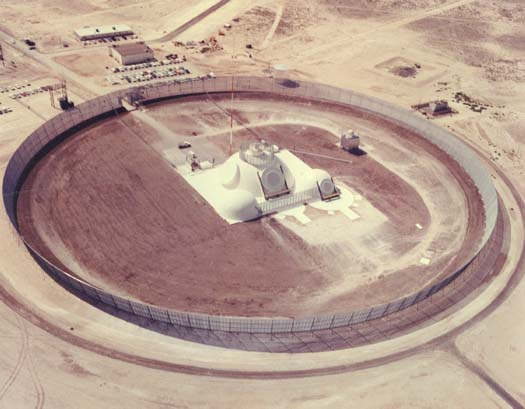
MAR-I at White Sands, seen looking towards the south-southwest. The transmitter is on the small dome on the right, with its associated receiver on the main dome above it. The elements fill only a small area of the original antenna outlines.

Work in ZMAR was already underway by the early 1960s, before McNamara canceled Zeus in 1963. Initial contracts were offered to Sylvania and General Electric (GE), who both built experimental systems consisting of a single row of elements, essentially a slice of a larger array. Sylvania's design used MOSAR phase-shifting using time delays, while GE's used a "novel modulation scanning system". Sylvania's system won a contract for a test system, which became MAR-I when Nike-X took over from Zeus.

To save money, the prototype MAR-I would only install antenna elements for the inner section of the original 40 foot (12 m) diameter antenna, populating the central 25 feet (7.6 m). This had the side-effect of reducing the number of antenna elements from 6,405 to 2,245 but would not change the basic control logic. The number of elements on the transmitter face was similarly reduced. A full sized, four-sided MAR would require 25,620 parametric amplifiers to be individually wired by hand, so building the smaller MAR-I greatly reduced cost and construction time. Both antennas were built full sized and could be expanded out to full MAR performance at any time. In spite of these cost reduction methods, MAR-I cost an estimated $100 million to build ($1038 million in 2025).

A test site for MAR-I had already been selected at WSMR, about a mile off of US Route 70, and some 25 miles (40 km) north of the Army's main missile launch sites along WSMR Route 2 (Nike Avenue). A new road, WSMR Route 15, was built to connect the MAR-I to Launch Complex 38 (LC38), the Zeus launch site. MAR-I's northern location meant that the MAR would see the many rocket launches taking place at the Army sites to the south, as well as the target missiles that were launched towards them from the north from the Green River Launch Complex in Utah.

Since MAR was central to the entire Nike-X system, it had to survive attacks directed at the radar itself. At the time, the response of hardened buildings to nuclear shock was not well understood, and the MAR-I building was extremely strong. It consisted of a large central hemispherical dome of 10 foot (3.0 m) thick reinforced concrete with similar but smaller domes arranged on the corners of a square bounding the central dome. The central dome held the receiver arrays, and the smaller domes the transmitters. The concept was designed to allow a transmitter and receiver to be built into any of the faces to provide wide coverage around the radar site. As a test site, MAR-I only installed the equipment on the northwest facing side, although provisions were made for a second set on the northeast side that was never used. A tall clutter fence surrounded the building, preventing reflections from nearby mountains.

Groundbreaking on the MAR-I site started in March 1963 and construction proceeded rapidly. The radar was powered up for the first time in June 1964 and achieved its first successful tracking on 11 September 1964, repeatedly tracking and breaking lock on a balloon target over a 50-minute period. However, the system demonstrated very low reliability in the transmitter's travelling wave tube (TWT) amplifiers, which led to an extremely expensive re-design and re-installation. Once upgraded, MAR-I demonstrated the system would work as expected; it could generate multiple virtual radar beams, could simultaneously generate different types of beams for detection, tracking, and discrimination at the same time, and had the accuracy and speed needed to generate many tracks.

By this time work had already begun on MAR-II on Kwajalein; built by General Electric, it differed in form and in its beam steering system. (Note: The Bell document is not clear on what sort of beam-steering system was used in MAR-II, but as it was built by General Electric it might use their "novel modulation technique." Alsberg mentions being invited to GE to see "an experimental array that used their system", which suggests the same.) The prototype MAR-II was built on reclaimed land just west of the original Zeus site. MAR-II was built into a pyramid with its back half removed. Like MAR-I, to save money MAR-II would be equipped with only one set of transmitter and receiver elements, but with all the wiring in place in case it had to be upgraded in the future. (Note: Bell's document is somewhat confusing on this point; although it definitely states only one of the two faces was installed, the text also suggests, but does not say specifically, that they also planned on installing half the elements, as they had on MAR-I.) Nike-X was canceled before MAR-II was complete, and the semi-completed building was instead used as a climate-controlled storage facility. (Note: Piland claims that the MAR-II was actually the prototype of something called CAMAR, a single-antenna version of MAR. This claim can be found on many web sites. However, the MAR-II building clearly has separate transmit/receive antennas, and the Bell documents all refer to this being a MAR system. CAMAR may have been a planned upgrade while MAR-II was under construction, but if this is the case it is not recorded in the Bell history.)

Testing on MAR-I lasted until 30 September 1967. It continued to be used at a lower level as part of the Sentinel developments. This work ended in May 1969, when the facility was mothballed. In November, the building was re-purposed as the main fallout shelter for everyone at Holloman Air Force Base, about 25 miles (40 km) to the east. To hold the 5,800 staff and their dependents, starting in 1970 the radar and its underground equipment areas were completely emptied. In the early 1980s, the site was selected as the basis for the High Energy Laser Systems Test Facility, and extensively redeveloped.

In 1972, Stirling Colgate, a professor at New Mexico Tech, wrote a letter to Science proposing salvaging MAR. He felt that after minor re-tuning it would make an excellent radio astronomy instrument for observing the hydrogen line. Colgate's suggestion was never adopted, but over 2000 of the Western Electric parametric amplifiers driving the system ended up being salvaged by the university. About a dozen of these found their way into the astronomy field, including Colgate's supernova detector, SNORT.

About 2,000 remained in storage at New Mexico Tech until 1980. An assay at that time discovered that there was well over one ounce of gold in each one, and the remaining stocks were melted down to produce $941,966 for the university ($4 million in 2025). The money was used to build a new wing on the university's Workman Center, known unofficially as the "Gold Building".

=== MSR ===
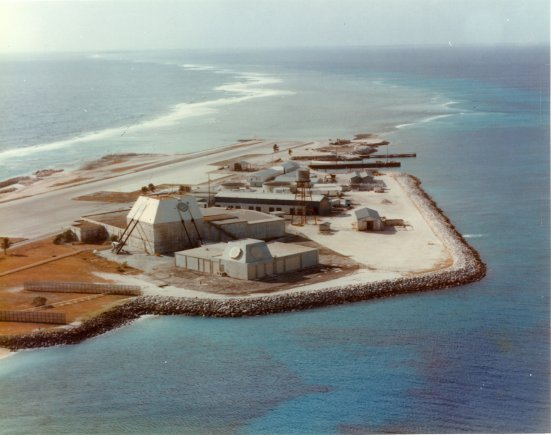
The prototype MSR was built onto the white pyramid on the building just left of center in this image. This was used into the 1970s, when the Safeguard program shut down. It was soon reactivated to test a smaller version of MSR known as the Site Defense Radar (SDR), which can be seen just to the right of the MSR.

Bell ran studies to identify the sweet spot for the MSR that would allow it to have enough functionality to be useful at different stages of the attack, as well as being inexpensive enough to justify its existence in a system dominated by MAR. This led to an initial proposal for an S band system using passive scanning (PESA) that was sent out in October 1963. Of the seven proposals received, Raytheon won the development contract in December 1963, with Varian providing the high-power klystrons (twystrons) for the transmitter.

An initial prototype design was developed between January and May 1964. When used with MAR, the MSR needed only short range, enough to hand off the Sprint missiles. This led to a design with limited radiated power. For Small City Defense, this would not offer enough power to acquire the warheads at reasonable range. This led to an upgraded design with five times the transmitter power, which was sent to Raytheon in May 1965. A further upgrade in May 1966 included the battle control computers and other features for the SCD system.

The earlier Zeus system had taken up most of the available land on Kwajalein Island itself, so the missile launchers and MSR were to be built on Meck Island, about 20 miles (32 km) north. This site would host a complete MSR, allowing the Army to test both MAR-hosted (using MAR-II) and autonomous MSR deployments. A second launcher site was built on Illeginni Island, 17.5 miles (28.2 km) northwest of Meck, with two Sprint and two Spartan launchers. Three camera stations built to record the Illeginni launches were installed, and these continue to be used as of 2017.

Construction of the launch site on Meck began in late 1967. In this installation, the majority of the system was built above ground in a single-floor rectangular building. The MSR was built in a boxy extension on the northwestern corner of the roof, with two sides angled back to form a half-pyramid shape where the antennas were mounted. Small clutter fences were built to the north and northwest, and the western side faced out over the water which was only a few tens of meters from the building. Illeginni did not have a radar site; it was operated remotely from Meck.

=== Sprint ===
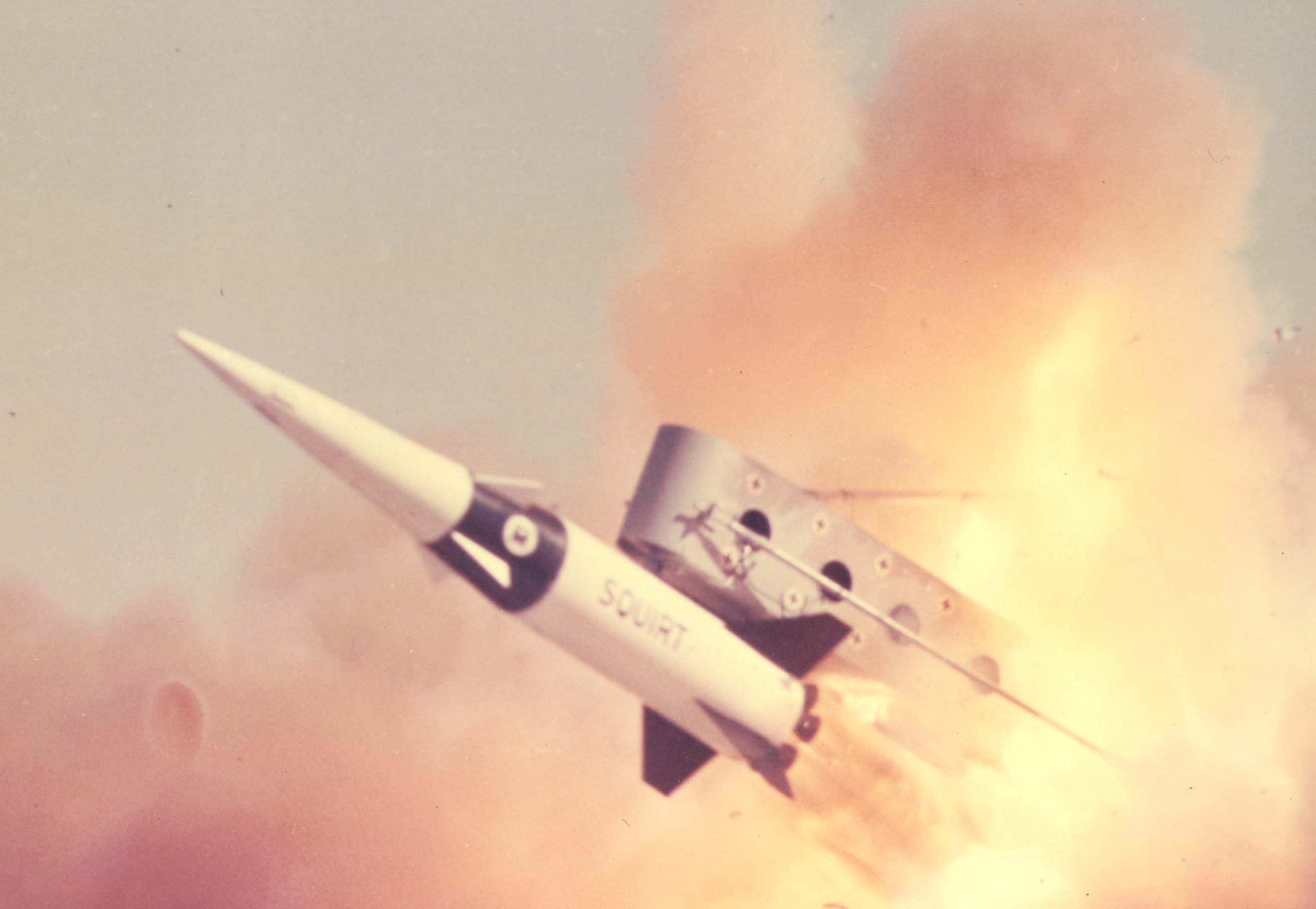
The sub-scale Squirt was used to test Sprint concepts.

On 1 October 1962, Bell's Nike office sent specifications for a high-speed missile to three contractors. The responses were received on 1 February 1963, and Martin Marietta was selected as the winning bidder on 18 March.

Sprint ultimately proved to be the most difficult technical challenge of the Nike-X system. Designed to intercept incoming warheads at an altitude of about 45,000 feet (14,000 m), it had to have unmatched acceleration and speed. This caused enormous problems in materials, controls, and even receiving radio signals through the ionized air around the missile. The development program was referred to as "pure agony".

In the original Nike-X plans, Sprint was the primary weapon and thus was considered to be an extremely high-priority development. To speed development, a sub-scale version of Sprint known as Squirt was tested from Launch Complex 37 at White Sands, the former Nike Ajax/Hercules test area. A total of five Squirts were fired between 6 November 1964 and 1965. The first Sprint Propulsion Test Vehicle (PTV) was launched from another area at the same complex on 17 November 1965, only 25 months after the final design was signed off. Sprint testing pre-dated construction of an MSR, and the missiles were initially guided by Zeus TTR and MTR radars. Testing continued under Safeguard, with a total of 42 test flights at White Sands and another 34 at Kwajalein.

=== Spartan ===
Zeus B had been test fired at both White Sands and the Zeus base on Kwajalein. For Nike-X, the extended range EX model was planned, replacing Zeus' second stage with a larger model that provided more thrust through the midsection of the boost phase. Also known as the DM-15X2, the EX was renamed Spartan in January 1967. The Spartan never flew as part of the original Nike-X, and its first flight in March 1968 took place under Sentinel.

=== Reentry testing ===
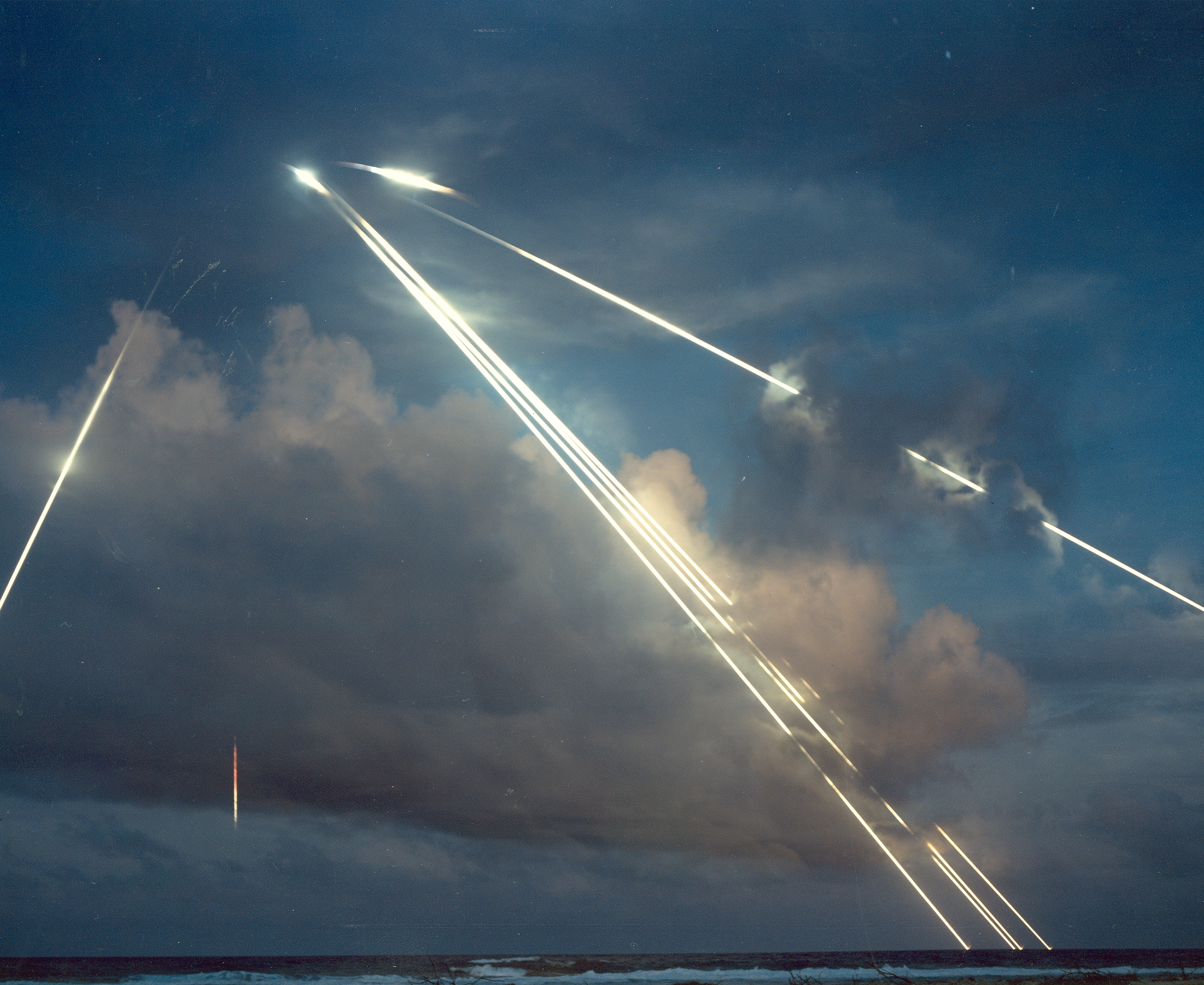
The RMP-2 tests in the late 1960s included the first live-fire MIRV tests with multiple reentry vehicles (MIRV).

One of the reasons for the move from Zeus to Nike-X was concern that the Zeus radars would not be able to tell the difference between the warhead and a decoy until it was too late to launch. One solution to this problem was the Sprint missile, which had the performance required to wait until decluttering was complete. Another potential solution was to look for some sort of signature of the reentry through the highest levels of the atmosphere that might differ between a warhead and decoy; in particular, it appeared that the ablation of the heat shield might produce a clear signature pointing out the warhead.

The reentry phenomenology was of interest both to the Army, as it might allow long-range decluttering to be carried out, and to the Air Force, whose own ICBMs might be at risk of long-range interception if the Soviets exploited a similar concept. A program to test these concepts was a major part of ARPA's Project Defender, especially Project PRESS, which started in 1960. This led to the construction of high-power radar systems on Roi-Namur, the northernmost point of the Kwajalein atoll. Although the results remain classified, several sources mention the failure to find a reliable signature of this sort. (Note: Bell's history makes several mentions of PRESS and later efforts' failures in this regard.)

In 1964, Bell Labs formulated their own set of requirements for radar work in relation to Nike-X. Working with the Army, Air Force, Lincoln Labs and ARPA, the Nike-X Reentry Measurements Program (RMP) ran a long series of reentry measurements with the Project PRESS radars, especially TRADEX. Additionally, a Lockheed EC-121 Warning Star aircraft was refit with optical and infrared telescopes for optical tracking tests. The first series of tests, RMP-A, focused on modern conical reentry vehicles. It concluded on 30 June 1966. These demonstrated that these vehicles were difficult to discriminate because of their low drag. RMP-B ran between 1967 and 1970, supported by 17 launches from Vandenberg, with a wide variety of vehicle shapes and penetration aids.

The program ran until the 1970s, but by the late 1960s, it was clear that discrimination of decoys was an unsolved problem, although some of the techniques developed might still be useful against less sophisticated decoys. This work appears to be one of the main reasons that the thin defense of I-67 was considered worthwhile. At that time, in 1967, ARPA passed the PRESS radars to the Army.

== Description ==
A typical Nike-X deployment around a major city would have consisted of several missile batteries. One of these would be equipped with the MAR and its associated DCDP computers, while the others would optionally have an MSR. The sites were all networked together using communications equipment working at normal voice bandwidths. Some of the smaller bases would be built north of the MAR to provide protection to this central station.

Almost every aspect of the battle would be managed by the DCDPS at the MAR base. The reason for this centralization was two-fold; one was that the radar system was extremely complex and expensive and could not be built in large numbers, the second was that the transistor-based computers needed to process the data were likewise very expensive. Nike-X thus relied on a few very expensive sites, and many greatly simplified batteries.

=== MAR ===
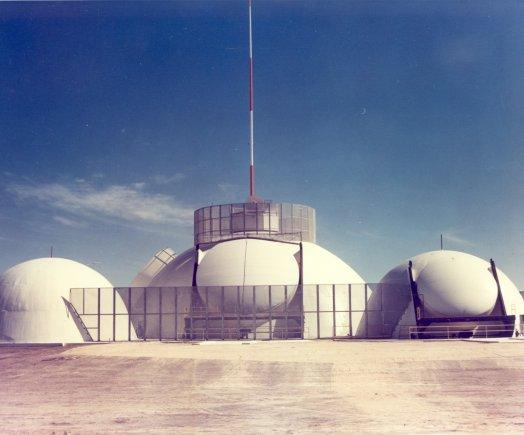
MAR-I had protective covers that slid up over the antenna elements, riding upward on the rails from their underground storage.

MAR was an L band active electronically scanned phased-array radar. The original MAR-I had been built into a strongly reinforced dome, but the later designs consisted of two half-pyramid shapes, with the transmitters in a smaller pyramid in front of the receivers. The reduction in size and complexity was the result of studies on nuclear hardening, especially those carried out as part of Operation Prairie Flat and Operation Snowball in Alberta, where a 500-short-ton (450 t) sphere of TNT was detonated to simulate a nuclear explosion.

MAR used separate transmitter and receivers, a necessity at the time due to the size of the individual transmit and receive units and the switching systems that would be required. Each transmitter antenna was fed by its own power amplifier using travelling wave tubes with switching diodes and striplines performing the delays. The broadcast signal had three parts in sequence and the receivers had three channels, one tuned to each part of the pulse chain. This allowed the receiver to send each part of the signal to different processing equipment, allowing search, track, and discrimination in a single pulse.

MAR operated in two modes: surveillance and engagement. In surveillance mode, the range was maximized, and each face performed a scan in about 5 seconds. Returns were fed into systems that automatically extracted the range and velocity, and if the return was deemed interesting, the system automatically began a track for threat verification. During the threat verification phase, the radar spent more time examining the returns in an effort to accurately determine the trajectory and then ignored any objects that would fall outside its area.

Those targets that did pose a threat automatically triggered the switch to engagement mode. This created a new beam constantly aimed at the target, sweeping its focus point through the threat tube to pick out individual objects within it. Data from these beams extracted velocity data to a separate computer to attempt to pick out the warhead as the decoys slowed in the atmosphere. Only one Coherent Signal Processing System (CSPS) was ever built, and for testing it was connected to the Zeus Discrimination Radar on Kwajalein.

Nike-X also considered a cut down version of MAR known as TACMAR. This was essentially a MAR with half of the elements hooked up, reducing its price at the cost of shorter detection range. The processing equipment was likewise reduced in complexity, lacking some of the more sophisticated discrimination processing. TACMAR was designed from the start to be able to be upgraded to full MAR performance if needed, especially as the sophistication of the threat grew. MAR-II is sometimes described as the prototype TACMAR, but there is considerable confusion on this point in existing sources. (Note: Bell's ABM history separates the MAR-II and TACMAR sections, but the TACMAR section does appear to describe a system very similar to what was installed at MAR-II. It then concludes its discussion of the MAR concepts by referring to "MAR, the Kwajalein prototype (MAR-II), and TACMAR", again suggesting these were different systems.)

=== MSR ===
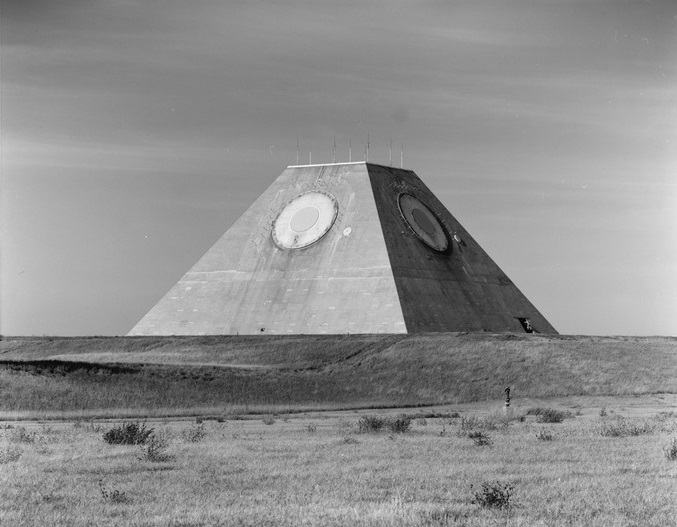
The TACMSR at Mickelsen was the only complete MSR built. The antenna elements only fill the center of the circular areas; the larger area was intended for possible future expansion

As initially conceived, MSR was a short-range system for tracking Sprint missiles before they appeared in the MAR's view, as well as offering a secondary target and jammer tracking role. In this initial concept, the MSR would have limited processing power, just enough to create tracks to feed back to the MAR. In the anti-jamming role, each MAR and MSR would measure the angle to the jammer.

The MSR was an S-band passive electronically scanned array (PESA), unlike the actively scanned MAR. A PESA system cannot (normally) generate multiple signals like AESA, but is much less expensive to build because a single transmitter and receiver is used for the entire system. The same antenna array can easily be used for both transmitting and receiving, as the area behind the array is much less cluttered and has ample room for switching in spite of the large radio frequency switches needed at this level of power.

Unlike the MAR, which would be tracking targets primarily from the north, the MSR would be tracking its interceptors in all directions. MSR was thus built into a four-faced truncated pyramid, with any or all of the faces carrying radar arrays. Isolated sites, like the one considered in Hawaii, would normally have arrays on all four faces. Those that were networked into denser systems could reduce the number of faces and get the same information by sending tracking data from site to site.

=== Sprint ===
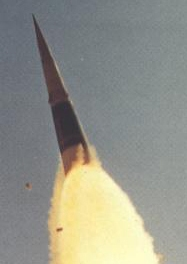
Sprint was the centerpiece of the original Nike-X concept, but it was relegated to a secondary role in Sentinel.

Sprint was the primary weapon of Nike-X as originally conceived; it would have been placed in clusters around the targets being defended by the MAR system. Each missile was housed in an underground silo and was driven into the air before launch by a gas-powered piston. The missile was initially tracked by the local MSR, which would hand off tracking to the MAR as soon as it became visible. A transponder in the missile would respond to signals from either the MAR or MSR to provide a powerful return for accurate tracking.

Although a primary concern of the Sprint missile was high speed, the design was not optimized for maximum energy, but instead relied on the first stage (booster) to provide as much thrust as possible. This left the second stage (sustainer) lighter than optimal, to improve its manoeuvrability. Staging was under ground control, with the booster cut away from the missile body by explosives. The sustainer was not necessarily ignited immediately, depending on the flight profile. For control, the first stage used a system that injected Freon into the exhaust to cause thrust vectoring to control the flight. The second stage used small air vanes for control.

The first stage accelerated the missile at over 100 g, reaching Mach 10 in a few seconds. At these speeds, aerodynamic heating caused the airframe's outer layer to become hotter than an oxy-acetylene welding torch. The required acceleration required a new solid fuel mixture that burned ten times as fast as contemporary designs such as the Pershing or Minuteman. The burning fuel and aerodynamic heating together created so much heat that radio signals were strongly attenuated through the resulting ionized plasma around the missile body. It was expected that the average interception would take place at about 40,000 feet (12,000 m) at a range of 10 nautical miles (19 km; 12 mi) after 10 seconds of flight time.

Two warheads were designed for Sprint starting in 1963, the W65 at Livermore and the W66 at Los Alamos. The W65 was entering Phase 3 testing in October 1965 with a design yield of around 5 kT, but this was cancelled in January 1968 in favor of the W66. The W66's explosive yield was reported to have been in the "low kiloton" range, with various references claiming it was anywhere from 1 to 20 kT. The W66 was the first enhanced radiation bomb, or neutron bomb, to be fully developed; it was tested in the late 1960s and entered production in June 1974.

== See also ==
- Project Nike, the technical office that ran Nike-X.
- The A-135 anti-ballistic missile system was the Soviet equivalent to Nike-X.
- Comparison of anti-ballistic missile systems
