= Thom–Sebastiani theorem =

In complex analysis, a branch of mathematics, the Thom–Sebastiani theorem states: given the germ $f : (\mathbb{C}^{n_1 + n_2}, 0) \to (\mathbb{C}, 0)$ defined as $f(z_1, z_2) = f_1(z_1) + f_2(z_2)$ where $f_i$ are germs of holomorphic functions with isolated singularities, the vanishing cycle complex of $f$ is isomorphic to the tensor product of those of $f_1, f_2$. Moreover, the isomorphism respects the monodromy operators in the sense: $T_{f_1} \otimes T_{f_2} = T_f$.

The theorem was introduced by Thom and Sebastiani in 1971.

Observing that the analog fails in positive characteristic, Deligne suggested that, in positive characteristic, a tensor product should be replaced by a (certain) local convolution product.
