= Illeginni Island =

Illeginni
- Location within Marshall Islands

Geography
- Location: South Pacific Ocean
- Coordinates: 9°5′9″N 167°28′23″E
- Length: 850 m (2790 ft)
- Width: 390–125 m (1,280–410 ft) eastern end is wider

Administration
- Republic of the Marshall Islands

Additional information
- Time zone: Marshall Islands Time Zone (UTC+12:00)

Illeginni (Marshallese: Likijjine, [lʲiɡittʲinʲe]) is an island in the Kwajalein Atoll, part of the Republic of the Marshall Islands (RMI).

Illeginni is located approximately 34 kilometres (21 mi) directly south of Roi-Namur Island, the northernmost part in the atoll, and 49 kilometres (30 mi) to the northwest of Kwajalein, the largest island and southernmost part of the atoll. The island runs roughly west-northwest to east-southeast. It is approximately 850 metres (2,790 ft) long and averages about 175 metres (574 ft) across. The northwestern end is a narrow finger that extends into several sandbars, while the southeastern end has a hook-shaped harbor on the north side.

Illeginni was the site of a Sprint missile launcher during the 1960s, part of the Nike-X anti-ballistic missile program. Sprint was a very short range system, and relied on a number of bases being spread around the area to be defended, one of these containing the control systems and master radar. Meck Island was the main base in the test system, while Illeginni was a model of the distributed launch sites. As Nike-X was modified to become Safeguard, Illeginni's site was changed (before construction) to hold four Sprint and four LIM-49 Spartan launchers. The launcher was abandoned after the Safeguard test program ended in the early 1970s.

A number of automated tracking cameras were installed as part of the Safeguard program, and one of these remains in use today to support overall operations of the Ronald Reagan Ballistic Missile Defense Test Site. The island also includes one of the two remote receivers for the TRADEX radar on Roi-Namur, the other remote is on Gellinam, close to Meck. When used together, the three radars are known as the Multistatic Measurement System, or MMS.

A harbor has been dredged in the northern side of the eastern end of the island, where it is its widest. The coral dredged from the harbor was used to build the berm for the missile silos. A helipad was installed on the eastern end of the island, adjacent to the harbor, but modern photography shows a new helipad on the former missile silos on the western end.
