= Sylvia de Neymet =

Mexican mathematician

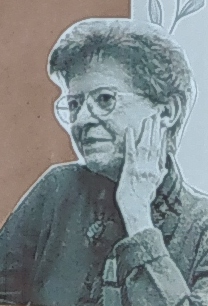
- Occupations: Mathematician and university professor

Academic background
- Education: CINVESTAV
- Doctoral advisor: Samuel Gitler

Academic work
- Discipline: Topological Transformation Groups
- Institutions: National Autonomous University of Mexico (UNAM), Instituto Politécnico Nacional

Sylvia de Neymet Urbina (aka Silvia de Neymet de Christ, 1939 – 13 January 2003) was a Mexican mathematician, the first woman to earn a doctorate in mathematics in Mexico, and the first female professor in the faculty of sciences of the National Autonomous University of Mexico (UNAM).

== Early life and education ==
De Neymet was born in Mexico City in 1939. Her mother had been orphaned in the Mexican Revolution of 1910, studied art at La Esmeralda, and became a teacher; she encouraged De Neymet in her studies. Her father's mother was also a teacher, and her father was a civil engineer. In 1955 she began studying at the Universidad Femenina de México, a women's school founded by Adela Formoso de Obregón Santacilia, and in her fourth year there she was hired as a mathematics teacher herself, despite the fact that many of her students would be older than her.

After two years of mathematical study in Paris, at the Institut Henri Poincaré, from 1959 to 1961, de Neymet returned to Mexico and completed her undergraduate degree in mathematics in 1961, with a thesis on differential equations supervised by Solomon Lefschetz, who by this time was regularly wintering at UNAM. At around the same time, CINVESTAV (the Center for Research and Advanced Studies of the National Polytechnic Institute) was founded. De Neymet became one of the first students there, and the first doctoral student of Samuel Gitler Hammer, one of the founders of CINVESTAV. She married Michael Christ, a French physician, in 1962. While finishing her doctorate, she taught courses at the Escuela Superior de Física y Matemáticas of the Instituto Politécnico Nacional. She completed her doctorate under Gitler's supervision in 1966, becoming one of the first seven people to earn a mathematics doctorate in Mexico, and the first Mexican woman to do so.

== Career and later life ==
After completing her doctorate, she joined the faculty of sciences of UNAM, one of only three full-time mathematicians there (with Víctor Neumann-Lara and Arturo Fregoso Urbina). After continuing her career at UNAM for many years, she died on 13 January 2003.

Her book Introducción a los grupos topológicos de transformaciones [Introduction to topological transformation groups] was published posthumously in 2005.
