= George F. D. Duff =

Canadian mathematician

- Born: July 28, 1926; Toronto, Ontario, Canada
- Died: March 2, 2001 (aged 74); Toronto, Ontario, Canada
- Education: University of Toronto; Princeton University
- Awards: Fellow of the Royal Society of Canada (1959)
- Scientific career
- Fields: Mathematics
- Workplaces: University of Toronto
- Doctoral advisor: Solomon Lefschetz

George Francis Denton Duff FRSC (July 29, 1926 – March 2, 2001) was a Canadian mathematician who did research in partial differential equations and wave phenomena. He took an interest in harnessing the extraordinarily large tides in the Bay of Fundy for generating electricity.

While studying at the University of Toronto, Duff became a Putnam fellow in 1948. After that, Duff was a PhD student of Solomon Lefschetz at Princeton University. He became a professor at the University of Toronto in 1952. There, he supervised the Ph.D. theses of 13 students and served as chair of the Mathematics Department from 1968 to 1975.

Duff was the president of the Canadian Mathematical Society from 1971 to 1973. He was an Invited Plenary speaker at International Congress of Mathematicians in Vancouver in 1974.
