= Robert C. Prim =

American mathematician (1921–2021)

Robert Clay Prim III (September 25, 1921 – November 18, 2021) was an American mathematician and computer scientist.

== Biography ==
Robert Clay Prim III was born in Sweetwater, Texas on September 25, 1921. In 1941, Prim received his B.S. in Electrical Engineering from The University of Texas at Austin, where he also met his wife Alice (Hutter) Prim (1921–2009), whom he married in 1942. Later in 1949, he received his Ph.D. in Mathematics from Princeton University, where he also worked as a research associate from 1948 until 1949.

During the climax of World War II (1941–1944), Prim worked as an engineer for General Electric. From 1944 until 1949, he was hired by the United States Naval Ordnance Lab as an engineer and later a mathematician. At Bell Laboratories, he served as director of mathematics research from 1958 to 1961. There, Prim developed Prim's algorithm. Also during his tenure at Bell Labs, Robert Prim assisted the Weapons Reliability Committee at Sandia National Laboratory chaired by Walter McNair in 1951. After Bell Laboratories, Prim became vice president of research at Sandia National Laboratories.

During his career at Bell Laboratories, Robert Prim along with coworker Joseph Kruskal developed two different algorithms (see greedy algorithm) for finding a minimum spanning tree in a weighted graph, a basic stumbling block in computer network design. His self-named algorithm, Prim's algorithm, was originally discovered in 1930 by mathematician Vojtěch Jarník and later independently by Prim in 1957. It was later rediscovered by Edsger Dijkstra in 1959. It is sometimes referred to as the DJP algorithm or the Jarník algorithm.

Prim was also the co-developer of Prim–Read theory, a game theory concept that calculates the best possible anti-ballistic missile (ABM) defensive layout. This demonstrated that the cost of the defence was always dramatically more than the offensive missiles needed to overwhelm it, and was one of the major reasons the US did not deploy an ABM system at the time.

Robert C. Prim died in San Clemente, California on November 18, 2021, at the age of 100.

== See also ==
- Joseph Kruskal
- Dijkstra's algorithm
