= Theorem of Bertini =

Algebraic geometry theorem

In algebraic geometry, the theorem of Bertini is an existence and genericity theorem for smooth connected hyperplane sections for smooth projective varieties over algebraically closed fields, introduced by Eugenio Bertini. This is the simplest and broadest of the "Bertini theorems" applying to a linear system of divisors; simplest because there is no restriction on the characteristic of the underlying field, while the extensions require characteristic 0.

== Statement for hyperplane sections of smooth varieties ==
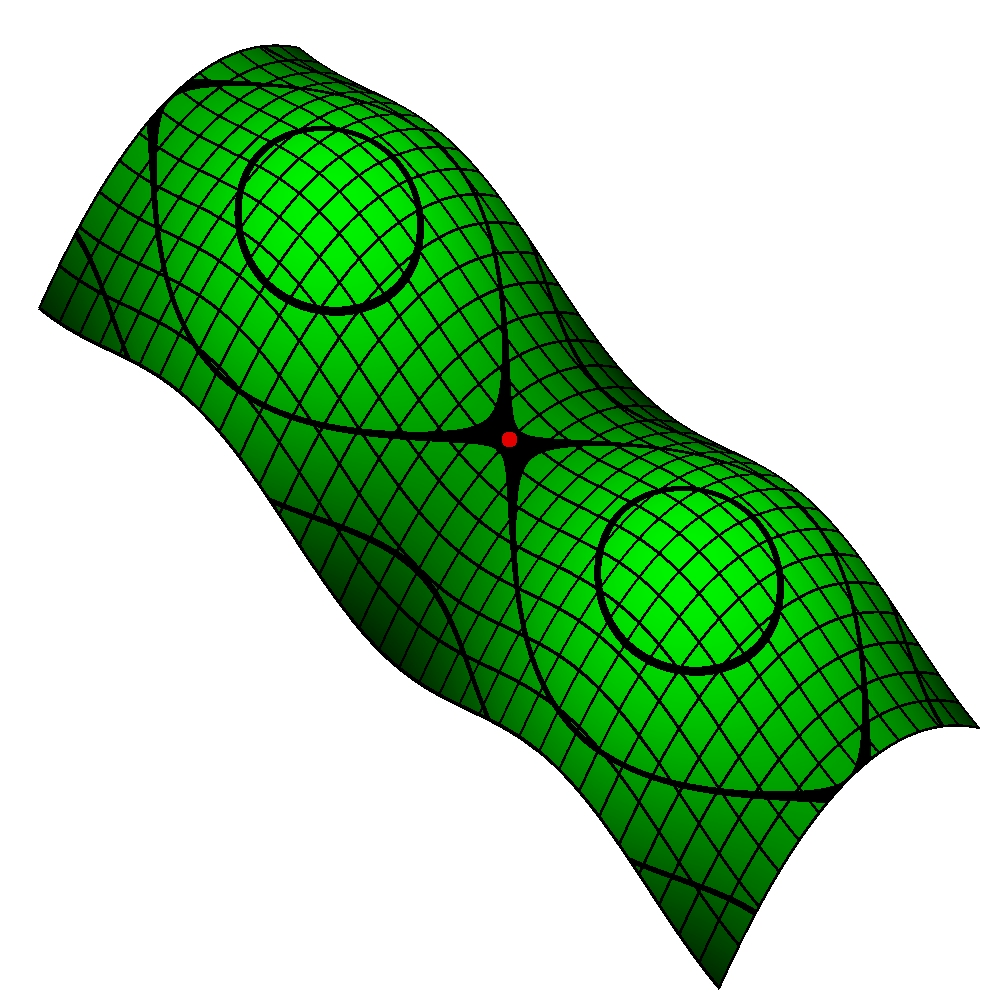
A smooth surface with one singular and two smooth plane sections

Let X be a smooth quasi-projective variety over an algebraically closed field, embedded in a projective space $\mathbf P^n$. Let $|H|$ denote the complete system of hyperplane divisors in $\mathbf P^n$. Recall that it is the dual space $(\mathbf P^n)^{\star}$ of $\mathbf P^n$ and is isomorphic to $\mathbf P^n$.

The theorem of Bertini states that the set of hyperplanes not containing X and with smooth intersection with X contains an open dense subset of the total system of divisors $|H|$. The set itself is open if X is projective. If $\dim(X) \ge 2$, then these intersections (called hyperplane sections of X) are connected, hence irreducible.

The theorem hence asserts that a general hyperplane section not equal to X is smooth, that is: the property of smoothness is generic.

Over an arbitrary field k, there is a dense open subset of the dual space $(\mathbf P^n)^{\star}$ whose rational points define smooth hyperplane sections of X. When k is infinite, this open subset then has infinitely many rational points and there are infinitely many smooth hyperplane sections in X.

Over a finite field, the above open subset may not contain rational points and in general there is no hyperplanes with smooth intersection with X. However, if we take hypersurfaces of sufficiently big degrees, then the theorem of Bertini holds.

== Outline of a proof ==
We consider the subfibration of the product variety $X \times |H|$ with fiber above $x\in X$ the linear system of hyperplanes that intersect X non-transversally at x.

The rank of the fibration in the product is one less than the codimension of $X \subset \mathbf P^n$, so that the total space has lesser dimension than $n$ and so its projection is contained in a divisor of the complete system $|H|$.

== General statement ==
Over any infinite field $k$ of characteristic 0, if X is a smooth quasi-projective $k$-variety, a general member of a linear system of divisors on X is smooth away from the base locus of the system. For clarification, this means that given a linear system $f:X\rightarrow \mathbf{P}^n$, the preimage $f^{-1}(H)$ of a hyperplane H is smooth -- outside the base locus of f -- for all hyperplanes H in some dense open subset of the dual projective space $(\mathbf{P}^n)^\star$. This theorem also holds in characteristic p>0 when the linear system f is unramified.

== Generalizations ==
The theorem of Bertini has been generalized in various ways. For example, a result due to Steven Kleiman asserts the following (cf. Kleiman's theorem): for a connected algebraic group G, and any homogeneous G-variety X, and two varieties Y and Z mapping to X, let Y^{σ} be the variety obtained by letting σ ∈ G act on Y. Then, there is an open dense subscheme H of G such that for σ ∈ H, $Y^\sigma \times_X Z$ is either empty or purely of the (expected) dimension dim Y + dim Z − dim X. If, in addition, Y and Z are smooth and the base field has characteristic zero, then H may be taken such that $Y^\sigma \times_X Z$ is smooth for all $\sigma \in H$, as well. The above theorem of Bertini is the special case where $X = \mathbb P^n$ is expressed as the quotient of SL_{n} by the Borel subgroup of upper triangular matrices, Z is a subvariety and Y is a hyperplane.

The theorem of Bertini has also been generalized to discrete valuation domains or finite fields, or for étale coverings of X.

The theorem is often used for induction steps.

== See also ==
- Grothendieck's connectedness theorem
