= Linear system of divisors =

Concept in algebraic geometry

A linear system of divisors algebraicizes the classic geometric notion of a family of curves, as in the Apollonian circles.

In algebraic geometry, a linear system of divisors is an algebraic generalization of the geometric notion of a family of curves; the dimension of the linear system corresponds to the number of parameters of the family.

These arose first in the form of a linear system of algebraic curves in the projective plane. It assumed a more general form, through gradual generalisation, so that one could speak of linear equivalence of divisors D on a general scheme or even a ringed space $(X, \mathcal{O}_X)$.

Linear systems of dimension 1, 2, or 3 are called a pencil, a net, or a web, respectively.

A map determined by a linear system is sometimes called the Kodaira map.

== Definitions ==
Given a general variety $X$, two divisors $D,E \in \text{Div}(X)$ are linearly equivalent if

$$E = D + (f)\$$

for some non-zero rational function $f$ on $X$, or in other words a non-zero element $f$ of the function field $k(X)$. Here $(f)$ denotes the divisor of zeroes and poles of the function $f$.

Note that if $X$ has singular points, the notion of 'divisor' is inherently ambiguous (Cartier divisors, Weil divisors: see divisor (algebraic geometry)). The definition in that case is usually said with greater care (using invertible sheaves or holomorphic line bundles); see below.

A complete linear system on $X$ is defined as the set of all effective divisors linearly equivalent to some given divisor $D \in \text{Div}(X)$. It is denoted $|D|$. Let $\mathcal{L}$ be the line bundle associated to $D$. In the case that $X$ is a nonsingular projective variety, the set $|D|$ is in natural bijection with $(\Gamma(X,\mathcal{L}) \smallsetminus \{0\})/k^\ast,$ by associating the element $E = D + (f)$ of $|D|$ to the set of non-zero multiples of $f$ (this is well defined since two non-zero rational functions have the same divisor if and only if they are non-zero multiples of each other). A complete linear system $|D|$ is therefore a projective space.

A linear system $\mathfrak{d}$ is then a projective subspace of a complete linear system, so it corresponds to a vector subspace W of $\Gamma(X,\mathcal{L}).$ The dimension of the linear system $\mathfrak{d}$ is its dimension as a projective space. Hence $\dim \mathfrak{d} = \dim W - 1$.

Linear systems can also be introduced by means of the line bundle or invertible sheaf language. In those terms, divisors $D$ (Cartier divisors, to be precise) correspond to line bundles, and linear equivalence of two divisors means that the corresponding line bundles are isomorphic.

== Examples ==
=== Linear equivalence ===
Consider the line bundle $\mathcal{O}(2)$ on $\mathbb{P}^3$ whose sections $s \in \Gamma(\mathbb{P}^3,\mathcal{O}(2))$ define quadric surfaces. For the associated divisor $D_s = Z(s)$, it is linearly equivalent to any other divisor defined by the vanishing locus of some $t \in \Gamma(\mathbb{P}^3,\mathcal{O}(2))$ using the rational function $\left(t/s\right)$ (Proposition 7.2). For example, the divisor $D$ associated to the vanishing locus of $x^2 + y^2 + z^2 + w^2$ is linearly equivalent to the divisor $E$ associated to the vanishing locus of $xy$. Then, there is the equivalence of divisors

$D = E + \left( \frac{x^2 + y^2 + z^2 + w^2}{xy} \right)$

=== Linear systems on curves ===
One of the important complete linear systems on an algebraic curve $C$ of genus $g$ is given by the complete linear system associated with the canonical divisor $K$, denoted $|K| = \mathbb{P}(H^0(C,\omega_C))$. This definition follows from proposition II.7.7 of Hartshorne since every effective divisor in the linear system comes from the zeros of some section of $\omega_C$.

==== Hyperelliptic curves ====
One application of linear systems is used in the classification of algebraic curves. A hyperelliptic curve is a curve $C$ with a degree $2$ morphism $f:C \to \mathbb{P}^1$. For the case $g=2$ all curves are hyperelliptic: the Riemann–Roch theorem then gives the degree of $K_C$ is $2g - 2 = 2$ and $h^0(K_C) = 2$, hence there is a degree $2$ map to $\mathbb{P}^1 = \mathbb{P}(H^0(C,\omega_C))$.

==== g_{d}^{r} ====
A $g^r_d$ is a linear system $\mathfrak{d}$ on a curve $C$ which is of degree $d$ and dimension $r$. For example, hyperelliptic curves have a $g^1_2$ which is induced by the $2:1$-map $C \to \mathbb P^1$. In fact, hyperelliptic curves have a unique $g^1_2$ from proposition 5.3. Another close set of examples are curves with a $g_1^3$ which are called trigonal curves. In fact, any curve has a $g^d_1$ for $d \geq (1/2)g + 1$.

=== Linear systems of hypersurfaces in a projective space ===
Consider the line bundle $\mathcal{O}(d)$ over $\mathbb{P}^n$. If we take global sections $V = \Gamma(\mathcal{O}(d))$, then we can take its projectivization $\mathbb{P}(V)$. This is isomorphic to $\mathbb{P}^N$ where

$$N = \binom{n+d}{n} - 1$$

Then, using any embedding $\mathbb{P}^k \to \mathbb{P}^N$ we can construct a linear system of dimension $k$.

=== Characteristic linear system of a family of curves ===
The characteristic linear system of a family of curves on an algebraic surface Y for a curve C in the family is a linear system formed by the curves in the family that are infinitely near C.

In modern terms, it is a subsystem of the linear system associated to the normal bundle to $C \hookrightarrow Y$. Note a characteristic system need not to be complete; in fact, the question of completeness is something studied extensively by the Italian school without a satisfactory conclusion; nowadays, the Kodaira–Spencer theory can be used to answer the question of the completeness.

=== Other examples ===
The Cayley–Bacharach theorem is a property of a pencil of cubics, which states that the base locus satisfies an "8 implies 9" property: any cubic containing 8 of the points necessarily contains the 9th.

== Linear systems in birational geometry ==
In general linear systems became a basic tool of birational geometry as practised by the Italian school of algebraic geometry. The technical demands became quite stringent; later developments clarified a number of issues. The computation of the relevant dimensions — the Riemann–Roch problem as it can be called — can be better phrased in terms of homological algebra. The effect of working on varieties with singular points is to show up a difference between Weil divisors (in the free abelian group generated by codimension-one subvarieties), and Cartier divisors coming from sections of invertible sheaves.

The Italian school liked to reduce the geometry on an algebraic surface to that of linear systems cut out by surfaces in three-space; Zariski wrote his celebrated book Algebraic Surfaces to try to pull together the methods, involving linear systems with fixed base points. There was a controversy, one of the final issues in the conflict between 'old' and 'new' points of view in algebraic geometry, over Henri Poincaré's characteristic linear system of an algebraic family of curves on an algebraic surface.

== Base locus ==
The base locus of a linear system of divisors on a variety refers to the subvariety of points 'common' to all divisors in the linear system. Geometrically, this corresponds to the common intersection of the varieties. Linear systems may or may not have a base locus – for example, the pencil of affine lines $x=a$ has no common intersection, but given two (nondegenerate) conics in the complex projective plane, they intersect in four points (counting with multiplicity) and thus the pencil they define has these points as base locus.

More precisely, suppose that $|D|$ is a complete linear system of divisors on some variety $X$. Consider the intersection

$$\operatorname{Bl}(|D|) := \bigcap_{D_\text{eff} \in |D|} \operatorname{Supp} D_\text{eff} \$$

where $\operatorname{Supp}$ denotes the support of a divisor, and the intersection is taken over all effective divisors $D_\text{eff}$ in the linear system. This is the base locus of $|D|$ (as a set, at least: there may be more subtle scheme-theoretic considerations as to what the structure sheaf of $\operatorname{Bl}$ should be).

One application of the notion of base locus is to nefness of a Cartier divisor class (i.e. complete linear system). Suppose $|D|$ is such a class on a variety $X$, and $C$ an irreducible curve on $X$. If $C$ is not contained in the base locus of $|D|$, then there exists some divisor $\tilde D$ in the class which does not contain $C$, and so intersects it properly. Basic facts from intersection theory then tell us that we must have $|D| \cdot C \geq 0$. The conclusion is that to check nefness of a divisor class, it suffices to compute the intersection number with curves contained in the base locus of the class. So, roughly speaking, the 'smaller' the base locus, the 'more likely' it is that the class is nef.

In the modern formulation of algebraic geometry, a complete linear system $|D|$ of (Cartier) divisors on a variety $X$ is viewed as a line bundle $\mathcal{O}(D)$ on $X$. From this viewpoint, the base locus $\operatorname{Bl}(|D|)$ is the set of common zeroes of all sections of $\mathcal{O}(D)$. A simple consequence is that the bundle is globally generated if and only if the base locus is empty.

The notion of the base locus still makes sense for a non-complete linear system as well: the base locus of it is still the intersection of the supports of all the effective divisors in the system.

=== Example ===
Consider the Lefschetz pencil $p:\mathfrak{X} \to \mathbb{P}^1$ given by two generic sections $f,g \in \Gamma(\mathbb{P}^n,\mathcal{O}(d))$, so $\mathfrak{X}$ given by the scheme

$\mathfrak{X} =\text{Proj}\left( \frac{k[s,t][x_0,\ldots,x_n]}{(sf + tg)} \right)$

This has an associated linear system of divisors since each polynomial, $s_0f + t_0g$ for a fixed $[s_0:t_0] \in \mathbb{P}^1$ is a divisor in $\mathbb{P}^n$. Then, the base locus of this system of divisors is the scheme given by the vanishing locus of $f,g$, so

$\text{Bl}(\mathfrak{X}) = \text{Proj}\left( \frac{ k[s,t][x_0,\ldots,x_n] }{ (f,g) } \right)$

== A map determined by a linear system ==
Each linear system on an algebraic variety determines a morphism from the complement of the base locus to a projective space of dimension of the system, as follows. (In a sense, the converse is also true; see the section below)

Let L be a line bundle on an algebraic variety X and $V \subset \Gamma(X, L)$ a finite-dimensional vector subspace. For the sake of clarity, we first consider the case when V is base-point-free; in other words, the natural map $V \otimes_k \mathcal{O}_X \to L$ is surjective (here, k = the base field). Or equivalently, $\operatorname{Sym}((V \otimes_k \mathcal{O}_X) \otimes_{\mathcal{O}_X} L^{-1}) \to \bigoplus_{n=0}^{\infty} \mathcal{O}_X$ is surjective. Hence, writing $V_X = V \times X$ for the trivial vector bundle and passing the surjection to the relative Proj, there is a closed immersion:

$$i: X \hookrightarrow \mathbb{P}(V_X^* \otimes L) \simeq \mathbb{P}(V_X^*) = \mathbb{P}(V^*) \times X$$

where $\simeq$ on the right is the invariance of the projective bundle under a twist by a line bundle. Following i by a projection, there results in the map:

$$f: X \to \mathbb{P}(V^*).$$

When the base locus of V is not empty, the above discussion still goes through with $\mathcal{O}_X$ in the direct sum replaced by an ideal sheaf defining the base locus and X replaced by the blow-up $\widetilde{X}$ of it along the (scheme-theoretic) base locus B. Precisely, as above, there is a surjection $\operatorname{Sym}((V \otimes_k \mathcal{O}_X) \otimes_{\mathcal{O}_X} L^{-1}) \to \bigoplus_{n=0}^{\infty} \mathcal{I}^n$ where $\mathcal{I}$ is the ideal sheaf of B and that gives rise to

$$i: \widetilde{X} \hookrightarrow \mathbb{P}(V^*) \times X.$$

Since $X - B \simeq$ an open subset of $\widetilde{X}$, there results in the map:

$$f: X - B \to \mathbb{P}(V^*).$$

Finally, when a basis of V is chosen, the above discussion becomes more down-to-earth (and that is the style used in Hartshorne, Algebraic Geometry).

== Linear system determined by a map to a projective space ==
Each morphism from an algebraic variety to a projective space determines a base-point-free linear system on the variety; because of this, a base-point-free linear system and a map to a projective space are often used interchangeably.

For a closed immersion $f: Y \hookrightarrow X$ of algebraic varieties there is a pullback of a linear system $\mathfrak{d}$ on $X$ to $Y$, defined as $f^{-1}(\mathfrak{d}) = \{ f^{-1}(D) | D \in \mathfrak{d} \}$ (page 158).

=== O(1) on a projective variety ===
A projective variety $X$ embedded in $\mathbb{P}^r$ has a natural linear system determining a map to projective space from $\mathcal{O}_X(1) = \mathcal{O}_X \otimes_{\mathcal{O}_{\mathbb{P}^r}} \mathcal{O}_{\mathbb{P}^r}(1)$. This sends a point $x \in X$ to its corresponding point $[x_0:\cdots:x_r] \in \mathbb{P}^r$.

== See also ==
- Brill–Noether theory
- Lefschetz pencil
- bundle of principal parts
