= Vanishing cycle =

In mathematics, vanishing cycles are studied in singularity theory and other parts of algebraic geometry. They are those homology cycles of a smooth fiber in a family which vanish in the singular fiber.

For example, in a map from a connected complex surface to the complex projective line, a generic fiber is a smooth Riemann surface of some fixed genus g and, generically, there will be isolated points in the target whose preimages are nodal curves. If one considers an isolated critical value and a small loop around it, in each fiber, one can find a smooth loop such that the singular fiber can be obtained by pinching that loop to a point. The loop in the smooth fibers gives an element of the first homology group of a surface, and the monodromy of the critical value is defined to be the monodromy of the first homology of the fibers as the loop is traversed, i.e. an invertible map of the first homology of a (real) surface of genus g.

A classical result is the Picard–Lefschetz formula, detailing how the monodromy round the singular fiber acts on the vanishing cycles, by a shear mapping.

The classical, geometric theory of Solomon Lefschetz was recast in purely algebraic terms, in SGA7. This was for the requirements of its application in the context of l-adic cohomology; and eventual application to the Weil conjectures. There the definition uses derived categories, and looks very different. It involves a functor, the nearby cycle functor, with a definition by means of the higher direct image and pullbacks. The vanishing cycle functor then sits in a distinguished triangle with the nearby cycle functor and a more elementary functor. This formulation has been of continuing influence, in particular in D-module theory.

== See also ==
- Thom–Sebastiani Theorem
