= Hyperplane section =

In mathematics, a hyperplane section of a subset X of projective space P^{n} is the intersection of X with some hyperplane H. In other words, we look at the subset X_{H} of those elements x of X that satisfy the single linear condition L = 0 defining H as a linear subspace. Here L or H can range over the dual projective space of non-zero linear forms in the homogeneous coordinates, up to scalar multiplication.

From a geometrical point of view, the most interesting case is when X is an algebraic subvariety; for more general cases, in mathematical analysis, some analogue of the Radon transform applies. In algebraic geometry, assuming therefore that X is V, a subvariety not lying completely in any H, the hyperplane sections are algebraic sets with irreducible components all of dimension dim(V) − 1. What more can be said is addressed by a collection of results known collectively as Bertini's theorem. The topology of hyperplane sections is studied in the topic of the Lefschetz hyperplane theorem and its refinements. Because the dimension drops by one in taking hyperplane sections, the process is potentially an inductive method for understanding varieties of higher dimension. A basic tool for that is the Lefschetz pencil.

== Examples ==
For example, if you have a projective variety $X \subseteq \mathbb{P}^n$, such as a cubic surface given by the vanishing locus $x^3 + y^3 + z^3 + w^3 \subseteq \mathbb{P}^3$, you can construct a hyperplace section of $X$, given by a section $h$ of $\mathcal{O}_X(1)$, so $h \in \Gamma(X,\mathcal{O}_X(1))$ has the associated vanishing locus $X_H$, which corresponds to the vanishing set of

$x^3 + y^3 + z^3 + w^3$ and $h = ax + by +cz + dw$

where $a,b,c,d$ are some constants. In fact, if you fix two of these constants and let the other two vary, then you can construct a Lefschetz pencil from that (because one may treat the equation $h_0 = ax + by$ as a fixed hyperplane and $h_\infty = cz + dw$ as the varying hyperplane).
