= Project Wizard =

US anti-ballistic missile system

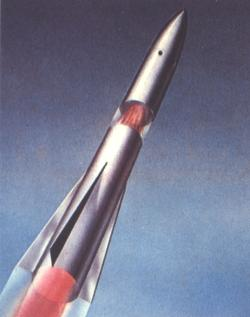
Artist's concept of Wizard

Project Wizard was a Cold War-era anti-ballistic missile system to defend against short and medium-range threats of the V-2 rocket type. It was contracted by the US Army Air Force in March 1946 with the University of Michigan's Aeronautical Research Center (MARC). A similar effort, Project Thumper, started at General Electric.

Early results demonstrated that the task of shooting down missiles appeared to be beyond the state of the art, and both projects were downgraded to long-term technology studies in the summer of 1947. They moved to the US Air Force with that force's creation in fall 1947. Due to budget constraints, Thumper was cancelled in 1949 and its funds re-directed to the GAPA anti-aircraft project. Partially due to the perceived threat of Soviet long-range bombers being more serious, and that the systems still appeared to be beyond the state of the art, the Air Force later cancelled Wizard as well. Funds from the Wizard, Thumper and GAPA concepts were all channeled into the new MX-606, a long-range surface-to-air missile project that eventually emerged in the late 1950s as the CIM-10 Bomarc.

In 1955 the Army announced its intention to develop a new anti-ICBM system based on its upcoming Nike Hercules systems. The Air Force immediately re-activated Wizard as an entirely new project with Convair and RCA, and later added Lockheed-Raytheon and the Bell Labs-Douglas Aircraft team developing Nike. The Air Force called Wizard the "Top Defense Missile" in 1957. In 1958, with the Army's Nike Zeus system planning to enter testing and Wizard still a paper project, The Pentagon told the Air Force to limit their work to long-range radars. In 1959 the Air Force cancelled Wizard, stating that any ABM system was less cost effective than building more ICBMs. These arguments would also be directed against Zeus, which was cancelled in 1963.

== Background ==
Between 1944 and 1945, about 3,600 German V-2 rockets were fired at allied targets in Europe. Armed with conventional high-explosive warheads, the V-2 had little serious strategic value, but if armed with nuclear weapons they could be significant weapons used against field targets in Europe. On 20 June 1945, the Army Ground Forces Equipment Review Board, or Cook Board, listed the requirement for "High velocity guided missiles...capable of...destroying missiles of the V-2 type, should be developed at the earliest practicable date." (Note: There seems to exist some disagreement among sources as to the exact nature of the events on 20 June. Leonard states this as the release date of the Cook Board report calling for development, but Walker et al state that on 20 June, Secretary of State Cordell Hull approved the transfer of German rocket specialists collected as part of Operation Paperclip to the Army, many of which were taken to the Ordinance Research and Development Division Sub-Office (Rocket) at Fort Bliss, both remotely and locally helping with refurbishing, assembling and launching V-2 rockets recovered from Germany and shipped to White Sands. They go on to state that the first call for an ABM occurred in July 1945, but that the final call for it didn't occur until December 1945. A technical report by the SDI possibly clarifies this and notes that "On 4 July 1945, a group of officers sent to Europe to study the Allied efforts to counter the V-2 recommended "that a research and development program be initiated the object of which would be to devise counter measures against V-2 type missiles."") In July 1945 the Signal Corps started basic research into two radar systems for ABM use.

By 1 April 1946 Robert P. Patterson, the Secretary of War, had signed off on an ABM. In February 1946 the War Department's Joint Committee on New Weapons and Equipment led by General Joseph Stilwell and generally known as the Stilwell Board was formed to consider the Army's post-war development priorities. On 29 May 1946 they published their report on a "Proposed National Program for Guided Missiles", noting that missiles with "intercontinental ranges of over 3,000 miles and payload sufficient to carry atomic explosive are to be expected." They suggested that defensive measures including anti-missiles should be "accorded priority over all other National Defense projects" and that the system be capable of supersonic speeds and 100,000 yards (91 km) range.

== Projects start ==
By this time the US Army Air Force (USAAF) had already started work on anti-V-2 weapons. On 4 March 1946 they sent out a contracts to University of Michigan and General Electric for "interceptor weapons for ballistic missile defense". (Note: Leonard states that Wizard was sent out in April, but all other sources state both contracts were sent on 4 March.) The contracts called for missiles capable of dealing with targets between 60,000 to 500,000 feet (18–152 km) altitude at speeds up to 4,000 miles per hour (6,400 km/h) and maximum range of 100,000 yards (91 km). (Note: Many sources claim the missiles had a range of 550 miles, but this the Stilwell definition calls for 100,000 yard range. The various sources disagree on a number of these basic issues, including whether there was any functional difference between the two contracts, with suggestions that Wizard called for a more capable design, and/or that Thumper was also required to deal with air-breathing missiles.) The contracts were called Project Wizard and Project Thumper, respectively, and in keeping with USAAF project naming policy, given the codes MX-794 and MX-795. The planned missiles were 60 feet (18 m) long and 6 feet (1.8 m) in diameter, with a range of 550 miles (890 km). with speeds of 4,000 to 5,000 mph with a 50 percent kill probability against a V-2.

Early results from Thumper and Wizard suggested that the problem was well beyond the state of the art. V-2's had flight times on the order of 5 minutes, and an attack could be carried out from any point within its approximate 200 miles (320 km) range. Early detection would require large radar systems (Chain Home was used for this purpose during World War II) which would have to calculate the approximate impact point and forward targeting information to an anti-missile battery in time for them to locate the target on their own radars and launch their missiles. Air Materiel Command estimated it would be five to ten years before the long-range radars, highly accurate guidance systems and long-range radar seekers could be developed.

However, they also suggested that these tasks would not be impossible given emerging technologies, especially against long-ranged missiles with longer flight times and higher apogee, which would give the early warning radar more time to track the targets. Accordingly, both projects were downgraded to long-term technology studies in the summer of 1947, allocated $1 million each.

== Thumper, Wizard and GAPA merge ==
With the creation of a separate United States Air Force (USAF) on 18 September 1947, the War Department divided up roles between the Army and the Air Force. There was no concern over the transfer of air-to-surface or air-to-air weapons, which went to the Air Force, but there was considerable debate over surface-to-surface and surface-to-air (SAM) weapons. The Air Force argued that it should be placed in command of all anti-air forces, including anti-aircraft artillery, as they would be operating in concert with the AF's fighters in the defense role. Ultimately the Army retained only one of the SAM projects, Nike, as this had originally been part of the Army Ordnance Department, not the Army Air Force.

By 1949 increasing budget pressures along with the success of the Army's Nike led to the Air Force's MX-606 Boeing Ground-to-Air Pilotless Aircraft (GAPA) anti-aircraft project being slated for cancellation. GAPA offered range and performance similar to Nike, but was nowhere near ready for deployment, while early Nike systems were already being test flown. At the same time the Soviet testing of a nuclear weapon and display of the Tu-4 Bull bomber placed the continental United States under the threat of attack, and attention quickly shifted away from the V-2 problem. To save what was their only SAM project in what was rapidly becoming an area of serious concern, the Air Force cancelled Thumper and its remaining funds were re-directed to GAPA. Wizard carried on as before, subsuming the Thumper work as well.

In January 1950 the USAF asked Boeing and MARC to consider merging the GAPA and Wizard projects. Wizard's long-range radars and communications systems, combined with a greatly enlarged GAPA powered by ramjets, would offer a clear alternative to the 35 miles (56 km) ranged GAPA or Nike. By June the teams' design was for a Mach 3 winged missile to intercept aircraft at 80,000 feet (24,000 m) up to 200 miles (320 km) away, eventually emerging as the CIM-10 Bomarc. Wizard ABM efforts ended.

Through the early 1950s, the entire ABM concept was largely ignored in favour of work on anti-aircraft systems. By 1954, Nike was beginning deployment and the Army was already beginning to explore advanced versions of the Nike concept that would emerge as the Hercules. Bomarc, meanwhile, was having considerable trouble at all levels.

The 1959 "Missile Master Plan" later included both the Hercules and Bomarc for SAM air defense. Ultimately, only a small Bomarc force would enter service as the Air Force moved their priorities elsewhere.

== New Wizard ==
Meanwhile, the nature of the strategic threat was changing once again. The Air Force had begun early studies of an intercontinental ballistic missile (ICBM) under MX-1593 in 1951, but this called for a warhead weight of 8,000 pounds (3,600 kg) and would require an enormous missile to deliver it. A test series in 1954 demonstrated highly favourable results from much lighter hydrogen bomb designs, and suddenly the ICBM appeared to be a very practical possibility. A contract was awarded to Convair for what would become the SM-65 Atlas on 14 January 1955.

With this change in strategic threat from aircraft to missiles, in 1954 the Army contracted Johns Hopkins University's operational research office (ORO) to prepare a detailed report on an ABM capable of countering ICBMs. In 1955 they followed this with a contract with Bell Labs, who developed Nike and Hercules, to determine whether an ABM system was now within the state of the art. Bell took 18 months to deliver their response, stating that recent developments in radars, and especially transistorized computers, offered the range and performance needed for the mission. Bell was given the go-ahead to start development in 1957, under the name Nike Zeus.

Almost immediately after the announcement of the new Army ABM program, in 1955 the Air Force started their own anti-ICBM development under the Wizard name. Convair won the prime contractor contest, partnering with RCA for the radar and computer systems. The Air Force soon followed this with similar contracts for a Lockheed-Raytheon group, and also invited Bell Labs-Douglas Aircraft to join. Both forces were now in a direct fight to deliver an ABM system, even competing for the teams who would handle development.

== Wilson reforms ==
While all of this was going on, inter-service fighting between the Army and Air Force was reaching a crescendo. This was due largely to the Army's intermediate-range Jupiter missile, which let the Air Force to hurriedly introduce their own IRBM, Thor. The Army argued that the medium-range role was basically an extension of their artillery service; they had used a similar argument to retain control of Nike, which had finally been conclusively handed to the Army after a long fight, by stating they were an extension of the mission previously held by anti-aircraft guns. The Air Force maintained that they were in control of the strategic force and should be in control of all long-range weapons. The fighting soon encompassed practically every area where the Army and Air Force had competing interests, including Jupiter and Thor, Nike and Bomarc, and Zeus and Wizard.

Trying to solve this problem, US Secretary of Defense, Charles Erwin Wilson considered a wide variety of problems between the forces. On 26 November 1956 he ordered that the Army would be in control of "point defense" systems and that the Air Force would be responsible for "area defense" systems. This had always unofficially been the case; the Army's weapons had generally been placed close to their targets due to performance limits, but now Wilson specified these to mean 200 miles (320 km) range in the surface-to-surface role, while surface-to-air systems would be limited to only 100 miles (160 km). This forced the Army to turn over its Jupiter systems to the Air Force, and to limit the range of their ABM and advanced anti-aircraft developments.

== Wizard cancelled ==
In August 1957 the Soviets successfully launched their R-7 Semyorka (SS-6) ICBM, and followed this up with the successful launch of Sputnik 1 in October. The threat of ICBM attack was now very real. Forming a panel to investigate the issue in August 1957, the new Secretary of Defense Neil McElroy published a lengthy report on the concept on 16 January 1958.

Having considered the stages of development of the various systems, McElroy essentially overturned the Wilson memo. In a "directive halting the WIZARD program", the Air Force was ordered to cease development of Wizard as a missile system, and use the project solely to develop long-range early-warning radars systems. The Air Force was already working on this as BMEWS, which they initially intended to work with a Wizard ABM. The Army was handed the job of actually shooting down the warheads, and McElroy gave them free hand to develop the Zeus system as they saw fit.

Two months later the Air Force appealed the decision, stating that "the Army's ZEUS did not have the growth potential to handle possible enemy evasion decoy and countermeasure tactics." This did not result in Wizard being re-funded, and ultimately the Assistant Secretary to the Air Force, Richard Horner, would state in 1959 that the cost of Wizard would outweigh any possible benefits, and that money would be better spent on more the offence. The arguments they outlined were so persuasive they led, ultimately, to the cancellation of the Zeus program, and continued controversy over all the ABM projects that followed it.
