= Clutter fence =

Radar system device

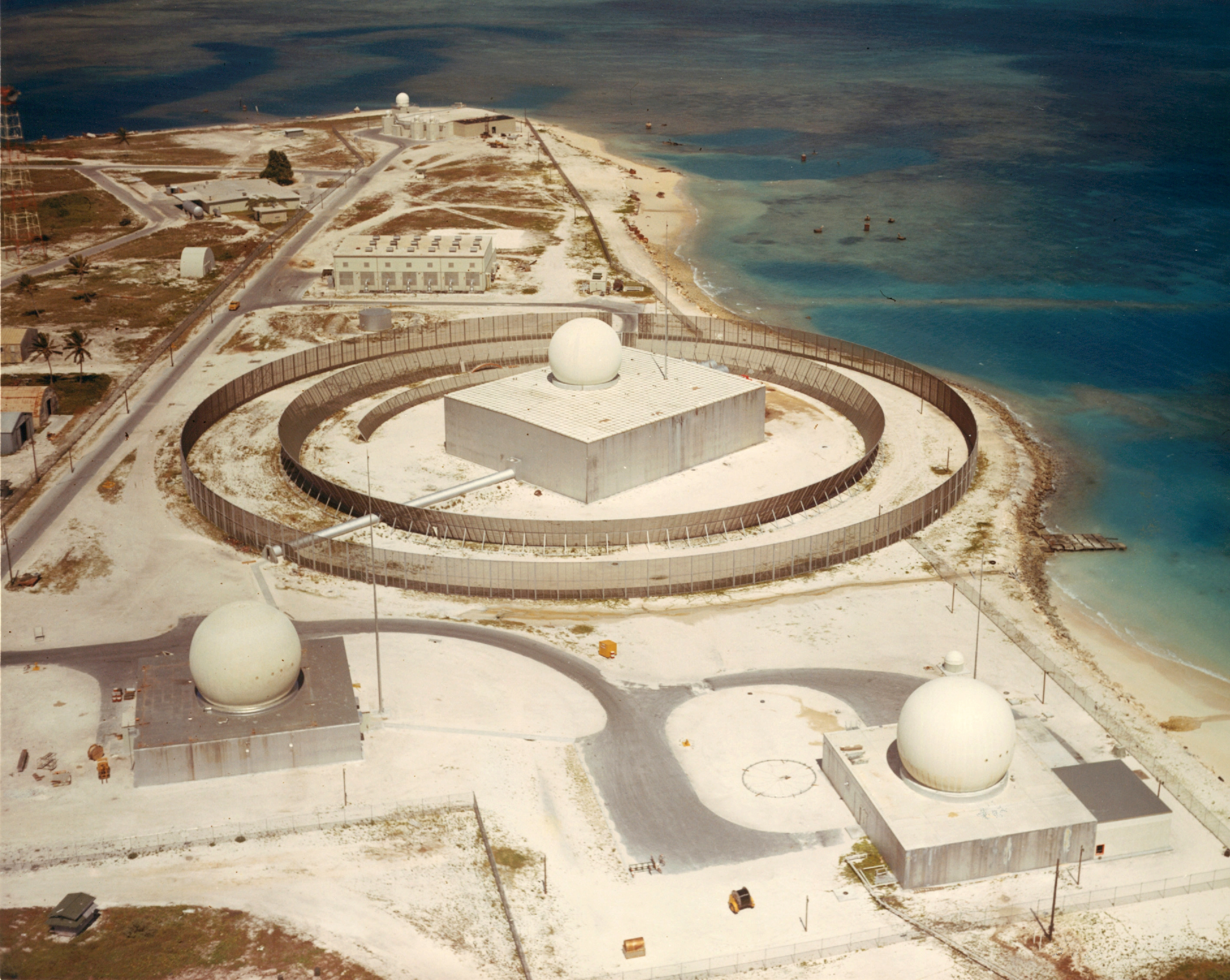
The Nike Zeus target tracking radars used a complex clutter fence to block signals reflecting off nearby buildings and other radars.

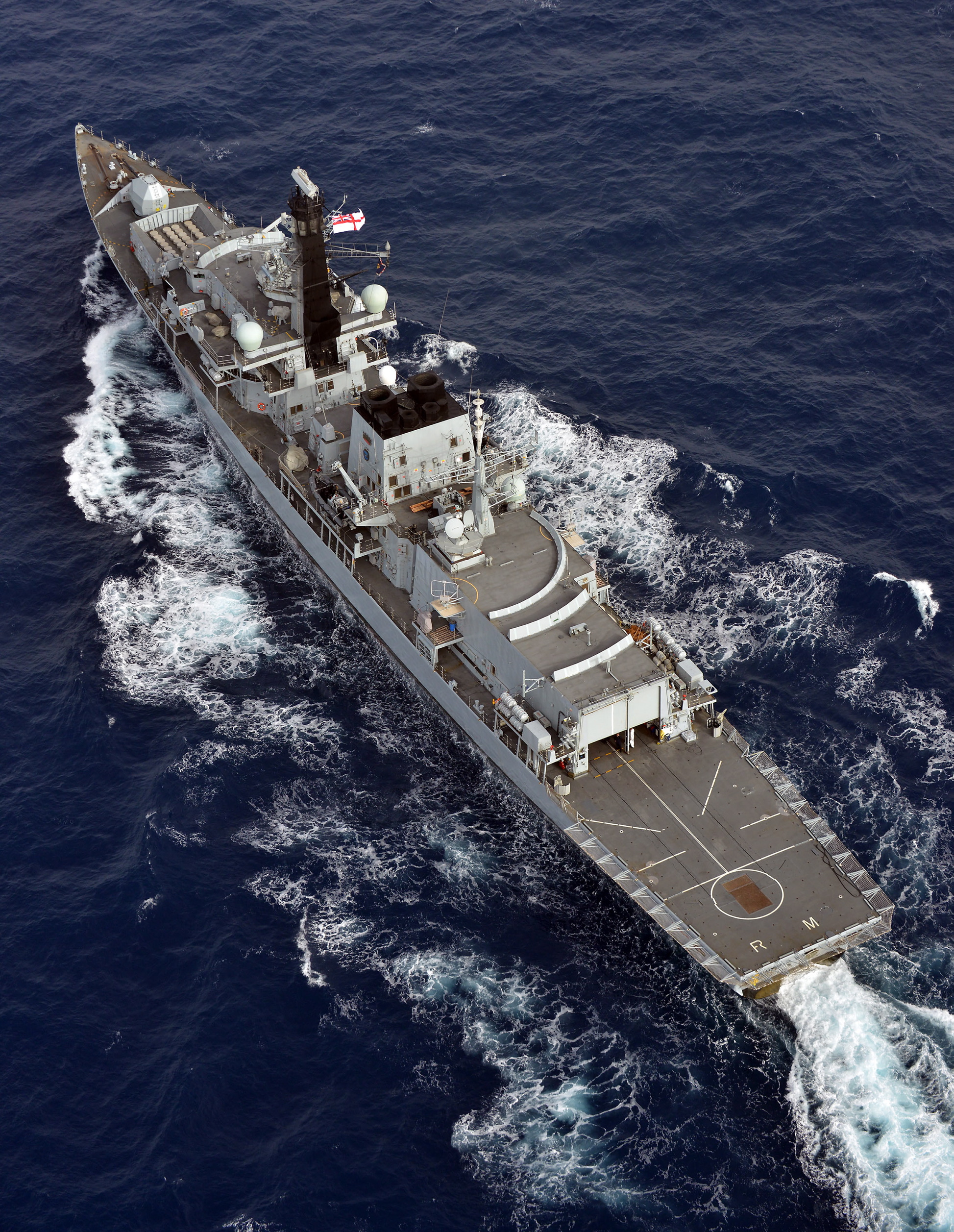
The clutter fences for the Sea Wolf trackers can be seen on top of the hangar and bridge of this Type 23 Frigate

A clutter fence is a device used with some radar systems to limit unwanted reflections from nearby objects reaching the receiver. These reflections could generate false or confusing data (clutter), obfuscating objects the radar is intended to detect.

A clutter fence is normally constructed from conventional metal fencing material. It may serve a secondary role by protecting crews on the ground from the intense microwave emission of some very high-powered radar transmitters.

Some upward facing atmospheric Wind profilers weather radars make use of clutter fences.

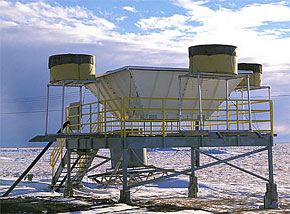
Atmospheric wind profiler with inverted triangular clutter fence
