= SAM-A-1 GAPA =

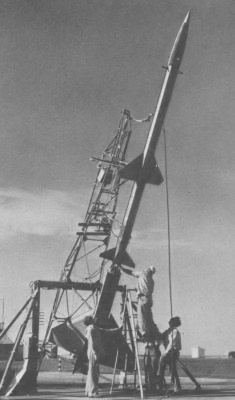
- Final check of Model 601 prior to launching at Holloman Air Force Base, c. 1949.
- Type: Surface-to-air missile
- Place of origin: United States

Service history
- In service: 1946-1950
- Used by: United States Air Force

Production history
- Designed: 1946
- Manufacturer: Boeing

Specifications (Model 603)
- Mass: 2,000 pounds (910 kg) w/o booster
- Length: 21 ft (6.4 m) w/o booster
- Diameter: 10 in (250 mm)
- Wingspan: 9 ft (2.7 m)
- Engine: Sustainer: Ramjet; Booster: Solid-fueled rocket
- Operational range: 31 miles (50 km)
- Flight ceiling: 59,000 ft (18,000 m)
- Maximum speed: 1,500 mph (2,400 km/h; Mach 2.0)
- Guidance system: Midcourse: Beam riding Terminal: Active radar homing
- Launch platform: Rail Launcher

The Ground-to-Air Pilotless Aircraft (GAPA) was a short-range surface-to-air missile (SAM) developed in the late 1940s by Boeing for the United States Army Air Forces, and then the United States Air Force after 1948. It was given the reference number SAM-A-1, the first Surface-to-Air Missile (SAM) in the 1947 tri-service designation system. By 1950, over 100 test rockets had been launched using a variety of configurations and power plants, with one launch in 1949 setting the altitude record for a ramjet powered vehicle at 59,000 ft (18,000 m).

GAPA faced strong competition from the United States Army's Nike missile system, and was eventually cancelled in favour of Nike for deployment. The GAPA work was later re-used by the Boeing and Project Wizard team at the Michigan Aeronautical Research Center to develop a much longer-ranged missile, the CIM-10 Bomarc for the Air Force. The Bomarc would end up competing with the Army's Nike Hercules, and was deployed only in small numbers.

== History ==
=== German work ===
The inherent inaccuracy of anti-aircraft artillery means that when shells reach their targets they are randomly distributed in space. This distribution is much larger than the lethal radius of the shells, so the chance that any one shell will successfully hit the target is very small. Successful anti-aircraft gunnery therefore requires as many rounds to be fired as possible, increasing the chances that one of the rounds will get a "hit". German gunners estimated that an average of 2,800 shells were required to down a single Boeing B-17.

Flying faster means that the aircraft passes through the range of a gun more rapidly, reducing the number of rounds a particular gun can fire at that aircraft. Flying at higher altitudes has a similar effect, as it requires larger shells to reach those altitudes, and this typically results in slower firing rates for a variety of practical reasons. Aircraft using jet engines basically double the speed and altitude of conventional designs, so limiting the number of shells that the chance of hitting the bomber essentially dropped to zero. As early as 1942, German flak commanders were keenly aware of the problem, and expecting to face jet bombers, they began a missile development program to supplant their guns.

Of the many programs that resulted, the designs fell into two categories. One used a high-speed missile that flew directly up at the target. With enough speed the missile did not have to "lead" the target by a great amount, as the bomber moved only a short distance in the time between launch and interception. A second class used aircraft-like designs that were first boosted to altitude in front of the bombers, then flew at them on intercept courses at much lower speeds. These were essentially radio-guided drone versions of the Messerschmitt Me 163 rocket-propelled interceptor aircraft carrying very large warheads.

=== US Army program ===
The western allies maintained air superiority for much of the war and development of new anti-aircraft systems was not as urgent. Nevertheless, by the mid-war period the US Army had reached the same conclusion as their German counterparts; flak was simply no longer useful. Accordingly, in February 1944 the Army Ground Forces sent the Army Service Forces (ASF) a request for information on the possibility of building a "major caliber anti-aircraft rocket torpedo". The ASF concluded that it was simply too early to tell if this was possible, and suggested concentrating on a program of general rocket development instead.

The introduction of German jet-powered bombers late in 1944 led to a re-evaluation of this policy, and on 26 January 1945 the Army Chief of Ordnance issued a requirement for a new guided missile weapon system. Like the German efforts, the Army designs quickly fell into two groups, high-speed line-of-sight weapons for short ranges, and airplane-like systems that flew at lower speeds but offered longer range. Eventually two such programs were selected; Bell Labs, a world leader in radar, radio control and automated aiming systems (see Hendrik Wade Bode) won the contract for a short-range weapon known as Project Nike. Boeing led development of an aircraft-like longer range system, GAPA, designated project MX-606.

=== GAPA ===
Although GAPA was based on similar principles as earlier German designs, it evolved into an entirely different concept; GAPA designs were long and thin and looked like missiles, not aircraft. Aerojet was selected to build solid-fuel boosters, while Boeing tried a wide variety of engine designs for the upper stage. The first test shot of an unguided GAPA airframe design took place on 13 June 1946 from a 100 ft × 100 ft (30 m × 30 m) launch pad at the GAPA Launch Site and Blockhouse, near the World War II Wendover Bombing and Gunnery Range on the western edge of the Bonneville Salt Flats. These early "Model 600" designs were for aerodynamic testing only, and used solid fuel in both stages. Over the following two week period, a total of 38 launches were conducted, ending on 1 July.

In a report to the President's Air Policy Commission in October, Boeing reported the range of the system at 30 miles (48 kilometres). The need for a 50-mile range, Mach 0.9 version was identified for the "interim" air defense system. In early 1948 the USAF was "ready to buy complete GAPA missiles for test and training purposes, [but] guidance components were not available", and of the planned $5.5 million for GAPA, only $3 million was provided in July 1948.

At the end of 1948, Air Materiel Command was instructed to buy 70 test vehicles. Over 74 launches took place at the Alamogordo Guided Missile Test Base beginning on 23 July 1947 (the 39th launch). A ramjet powered Model 602 first flew on 14 November 1947, and a liquid-fuel rocket Model 601 on 12 March 1948. By the end of the test program in 1950, 114 launches were carried out, with the last on 15 August 1950.

By 1949 the performance of the competing Nike design had demonstrated capabilities similar to GAPA, at about 25 miles (40 kilometres), and was much closer to being ready for deployment. The Department of Defense (DoD) saw no need for two systems with similar performance, and inter-service fighting since the 1948 creation of the Air Force was a constant problem for the DoD. They eventually decided the matter in 1949 when the Joint Chiefs of Staff determined that each branch of the armed forces would conduct missile development according to its mission and handed the Army control of all short-range air defences, whether missile or gun. GAPA was cancelled outright, and a new contract for a much longer-range weapon was created under MX-1599. To keep GAPA development alive in the meantime, the US Air Force re-directed funding from an anti-ballistic missile program, Project Thumper, which was being ended in favour of a more advanced system, Project Wizard.

=== Computer work ===
Boeing built two computers to aid with development of the GAPA effort. The first was the BEMAC, Boeing Electro-Mechanical Analog Computer, which was used for various calculations and aerodynamic research. The second, BEAC, the Boeing Electronic Analog Computer, was developed in 1949 in Seattle to aid calculations in the GAPA project. BEAC proved so useful that other divisions within the company started asking for time on the system. This led the Physical Research Unit to build further examples of improved models of BEAC for the Acoustics and Electrical Department, Aerodynamics, Power Plant, Mechanical Equipment and Structures Department. Given the success of the BEAC design, the company began to offer it commercially in 1950. Sales continued through the 1950s.

=== Bomarc ===
The new MX-1599 also ran into development and funding problems, and repeated early history when the project was joined by the team from the Michigan Aeronautical Research Center (MARC) working on Project Wizard. Wizard was based on a high performance missile, existing only on paper, able to intercept missiles travelling at up to 4,000 mph (6,400 km/h) at altitudes up to 500,000 ft (150 km). Wizard had also put considerable thought into the problem of early detection and communications needed for interceptions that lasted only minutes. The combination of the two teams, from Boeing and MARC, resulted in the new BOMARC name. At the time the Air Force considered missiles to be unmanned aircraft, and assigned the new missile the "F-99" name, considering its role to be the same as a fighter aircraft. This was later changed to "Interceptor Missile", IM-99. and finally CIM-10 Bomarc when the 1963 United States Tri-Service missile and drone designation system was introduced.

Bomarc development dragged on, and by 1956, less than 25 test launches had taken place, many of them failures. By this point, the Army had begun early production of its greatly improved Nike Hercules missile, which offered high supersonic speeds, intercept altitudes as high as 100,000 ft (30 km), and ranges on the order of 75 miles (121 km). Although Bomarc's range was much greater than Hercules, the mission of protecting cities was adequately served, and Hercules was dramatically simpler, cheaper and more reliable (Bomarc was estimated to be ready to fire 25% of the time or less).

== Description ==
There were three main models of the GAPA vehicle, and their layout differed considerably. All were "missile like" with four cropped-delta fins at the extreme rear of a cylindrical fuselage capped with an ogive nose cone. Aerodynamic lift for control was provided by a long wing running along the upper surface of the fuselage, only slightly wider that the body. The wing tapered to a point just behind the nose cone. The booster was about the same length as the missile, although slightly larger in diameter and featuring much larger cropped-delta fins.

GAPA used beam riding guidance, in which the missile attempts to keep itself centred in the middle of a radar signal that is pointed directly at the target. This system allows a single powerful radar to act as both the tracking and guidance system. However, beam riding also means that the missile has to fly directly at its target, and therefore cannot "lead" it to a calculated intercept point. This means of guidance is generally inefficient as it requires the missile to continue maneuvering throughout the approach as the radar is moved to continue tracking the target. This can be significant in the case of high-speed aircraft.

External image
- Alamogorda launch site map (p. 18) & "GAPA Model 601" on launcher (p. 20)

== See also ==
- IM-99 BOMARC
- SA-2 Guideline
