= 2nd Battalion, 52nd Air Defense Artillery Regiment =

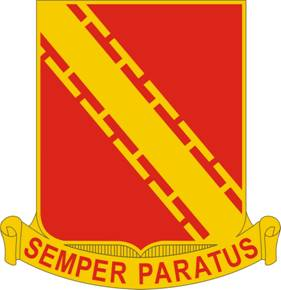
- Regimental insignia
- Active: 1917-1922, 1941-1945, 1946-1947, 1951-1958, 1959-1983, 1988-1993
- Country: United States
- Branch: United States Army
- Role: Air defense
- Size: Battalion
- Motto(s): Always Prepared
- Equipment: FIM-92 Stinger (former); MIM-23 HAWK (former); MIM-14 Nike Hercules (former); MIM-3 Nike Ajax (former); M1888 (former)
- Decorations: Meritorious Unit Citation; Valorous Unit Award

The 2nd Battalion, 52nd Air Defense Artillery Regiment was an air defense artillery battalion in the United States Army. The battalion is part of the 52nd Air Defense Artillery Regiment.

The battalion is most known for its participation in the defense of southern Florida during the Cuban Missile Crisis and as the last Nike Hercules unit to defend the continental United States.

The battalion was last active as a HAWK unit subordinate to the 108th Air Defense Artillery Brigade at Fort Bragg, North Carolina until 1993.

== History ==
The 2nd Battalion, 52nd Air Defense Artillery Regiment was first organized on 01 April 1917 as the 6th Company, Fort Terry, New York. The unit was reorganized and redesignated on 22 July 1917 as Battery B, 7th Provisional Regiment (Coast Artillery Corps) and deployed to France for World War I. The unit was redesignated on 05 February 1918 as Battery B, 52nd Artillery Regiment (Coast Artillery Corps) and fought in the battle of Meuse-Argonne (26 September - 10 October). The unit was one of the first American units to return to the United States in December 1918.

After the war, the unit was stationed at Fort Eustis, Virginia. The unit received an additional designation on 01 June 1922 as the 225th Company (Coast Artillery Corps) which was removed when the unit was redesignated on 20 February 1924 as Battery B, 52nd Coast Artillery Regiment. The unit was inactivated on 01 August 1922. The unit was reactivated on 01 June 1941 at Fort Hancock, New Jersey.

With the outbreak of World War II, the unit was deployed in December 1941 to Honolulu, Hawai'i. The unit returned to Fort Hancock in February 1942 less personnel and equipment. On 01 May 1943, the 52nd Coast Artillery Regiment was broken up and the unit was redesignated as Battery B, 286th Coast Artillery Battalion. With less need for the coastal defense of the United States, the unit was converted and redesignated on 30 August 1944 as Battery B, 538th Field Artillery Battalion. The unit deployed to France on 03 April 1945 and participated in the occupation of Germany from 02 May - 29 October. The unit returned to the United States and was inactivated on 14 December 1945 at Camp Myles Standish, Massachusetts. The unit was reactivated 31 December 1946 on Luzon in the Philippines but was inactivated on 30 May 1947. The unit was reactivated again on 22 March 1951 at Camp Carson, Colorado and relocated to West Germany where it was inactivated on 01 June 1958.

The unit was redesignated on 26 February 1959 as the 2nd Missile Battalion, 52nd Artillery Regiment and activated on 15 April 1959 at Fort Bliss, Texas as a Nike Ajax unit subordinate to the 6th Air Defense Artillery Group and was a Strategic Army Corps unit. The unit was upgraded to Nike Hercules in late 1959. Battery B was moved to Johnston Atoll on 13 September 1962 to participate in nuclear tests during Operation Dominic. On 25 October 1962, the unit was deployed to South Florida in response to the Cuban Missile Crisis (minus Battery B). The unit established temporary tactical sites: Headquarters and Headquarters Battery (HHB) was in a former B&L Farms tomato packing house in Princeton, Battery A was in a tomato field near Everglades National Park (HM-65), Battery C was in Carol City (HM-01), and Battery D was west of Miami (HM-95). On 03 November 1962, Battery B fired a Nike Hercules missile with a W31 10-kiloton warhead as the last atmospheric nuclear test conducted by the United States. Battery B would join the rest of the unit in Florida and establish a site next to Battery A (HM-66).

In April 1963 the unit fell under the Army Air Defense Command (ARADCOM) and it was decided to make the air defense sites in South Florida permanent. HHB was moved to Homestead Air Force Base, Battery A was moved to Everglades National Park (HM-69), Battery B was moved to Key Largo (HM-40) and had the only high-power acquisition radar (HIPAR), Battery C's site was improved and renamed HM-03, and Battery D remained at HM-95. The unit was awarded the Meritorious Unit Citation by President Kennedy for their actions during the Cuban Missile Crisis. The unit was redesignated on 20 December 1965 as 2nd Battalion, 52nd Artillery Regiment and finally on 01 September 1971 as 2nd Battalion, 52nd Air Defense Artillery Regiment. The unit co-defended the Miami-Homestead area with a HAWK unit (8th Battalion, 15th Artillery Regiment, later redesignated 3rd Battalion, 68th Air Defense Artillery Regiment). The unit was subordinate to the 13th Artillery Group, then the 53rd Artillery Brigade, and then the 31st Air Defense Artillery Brigade. The unit stood down and relocated back to Fort Bliss in September 1979 to become a training unit for NATO soldiers using Nike Hercules. The unit was inactivated on 15 March 1983.

The unit was reactivated on 16 April 1988 when 3rd Battalion, 68th Air Defense Artillery Regiment was reflagged as 2nd Battalion, 52nd Air Defense Artillery Regiment at Fort Bragg, North Carolina subordinate to the 108th Air Defense Artillery Brigade. The unit deployed to Saudi Arabia in 1990 to participate in the Persian Gulf War and received the Valorous Unit Award for its actions. The unit was inactivated on 15 September 1993.

== Campaign Participation ==
- World War I
  - Champagne-Marne
  - St. Mihiel
  - Meuse-Argonne
  - Champagne 1918
  - Lorraine 1918
- World War II
  - Central Europe
  - Central Pacific
  - New Guinea (with arrowhead)
  - Luzon
  - Southern Philippines (with arrowhead)
- Korean War
  - UN Defensive
  - UN Offensive
  - CCF Intervention
  - First UN Counteroffensive
  - CCF Spring Offensive
  - UN Summer-Fall Offensive
  - Second Korean Winter
  - Korea Summer 1953
- Persian Gulf War
  - Defense of Saudi Arabia
  - Liberation of Kuwait

== Decorations ==
- Presidential Unit Citation (Defense of Korea)
- Meritorious Unit Commendation (Florida 1962-1963)
- Valorous Unit Award (Saudi Arabia and Bahrain)

== Sources ==
- Sawicki, James A. Antiaircraft Artillery Battalions of the U.S. Army: Volume I, Wyvern Publications: Dumfries, 1991.
- Sawicki, James A. Field Artillery Battalions of the U.S. Army: Volume II, Centaur Publications: Dumfries, 1978.
- McKenney, Janice E. (2000). Air Defense Artillery. Washington, D.C.: United States Army Center of Military History. p. 211.
- Romanych, Marc and Jacqueline Scott. The HAWK Air Defense Missile System, Osprey Publishing: New York, 2022.
