= Nike J =

Japanese version of the Nike-Hercules surface-to-air missile

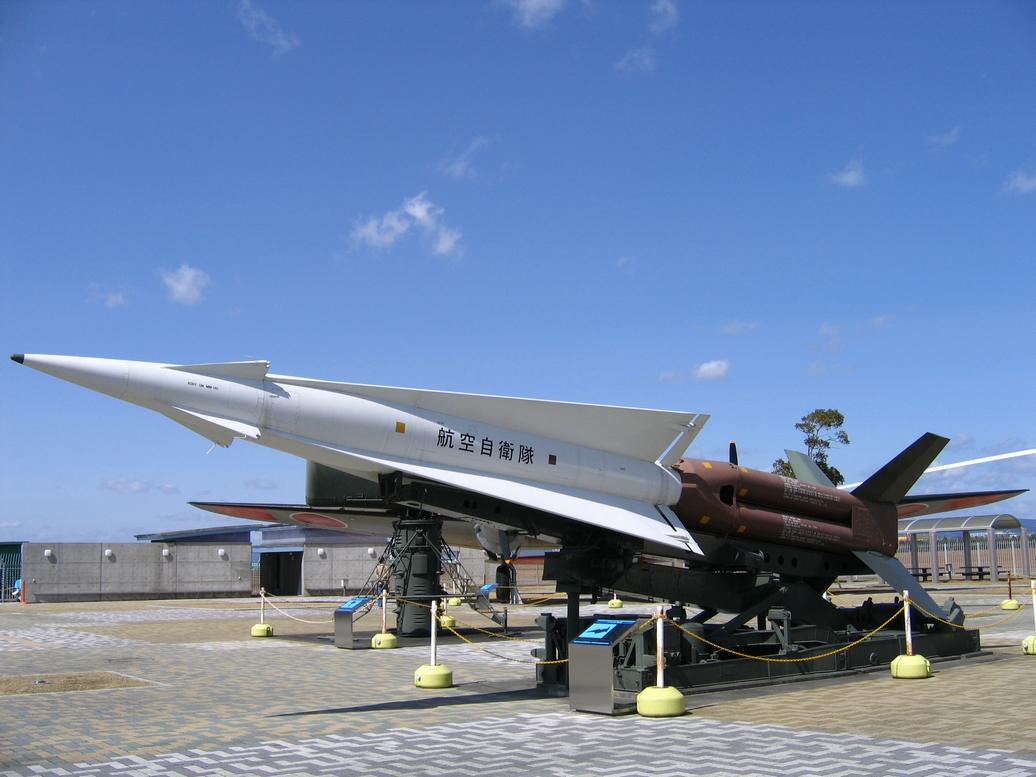
Nike J at Hamamatsu Air Base

NIKE J was the name for the Japanese version of the Nike Hercules surface-to-air missile. It was produced by Mitsubishi Heavy Industries. First test firings of the missile occurred in November 1970. The Nike J was also a different version of the usual Nike Hercules, in that way, that it could not be mated with a special (nuclear) warhead.

- Length: 12.5 m
- Diameter: 0.8 m
- Wing span: 2.1 m
- Weight: 4.5 tons
- Range: 130 km
- Speed: Mach 3
- Propulsion: two-stage solid-fuel rocket
- Guidance: radio command guidance

== See also ==
- MIM-14 Nike Hercules
- Nike Javelin
