= SAM-A-19 Plato =

- Type: Anti-ballistic missile
- Place of origin: United States

Service history
- Used by: United States Army

Production history
- Designer: Sylvania Electric Products
- Designed: 1956

The SAM-A-19 Plato was an anti-ballistic missile project developed by the United States Army in the mid 1950s. By modern standards, it would be considered a theatre ballistic missile (TBM) defense system (TBMD), providing protection to the Army field units from Warsaw Bloc short and medium-range weapons.

The Army had first considered anti-ballistic missiles as early as 1946, in order to protect against attack by V-2 missiles and similar weapons. This work, Project Thumper and Project Wizard, was handed off to the US Air Force when that command was created in 1948. Delays and changes of mission for Wizard led to the Army re-considering their own needs, and started the Plato study in 1952. Sylvania won a development contract in 1956, and the proposed missile was assigned the designation SAM-A-19.

When rapid deployment of theatre weapons during the late 1950s placed the Army at risk, Plato was still nowhere near ready for deployment. Plato was canceled in February 1959 in favor of modifications to the Hawk and Hercules anti-aircraft missiles to provide some level of protection while a much more capable system, FABMDS, was developed. FABMDS was in turn canceled due to mobility concerns, and replaced by SAM-D, today's Patriot.

== History ==
=== Early work ===
As part of a sweeping review of post-war requirements, on 20 June 1945 the Army Ground Forces Equipment review listed the requirement for "High velocity guided missiles… capable of… destroying missiles of the V-2 type, should be developed at the earliest practicable date." In July of that year, the US Army Signal Corps started basic research into two radar systems for ABM use. In January 1946 the Commanding General of the Army Ground Forces (AGF) established a requirement for a study program on the V-2 problem. In early February, the Joint Committee on New Weapons and Equipment, the "Stillwell Board" run by Joseph Stilwell, restated the antimissile requirement in its report on a Proposed National Program for Guided Missiles. By 1 April Secretary of War Robert P. Patterson had signed off on the program, and at the end of May the Stilwell Board published a requirement for an antimissile with a 100,000 yard range.

In March 1946 the Air Forces started Project Thumper (also known as MX-795) to consider the problem of defending against ballistic missiles like the V-2, using the "collision intercept" method. General Electric won the contract for Thumper, which is the first known ABM effort. Thumper was followed in April by a similar contract awarded to the Michigan Aeronautical Research Center (MARC) under the name Project Wizard (MX-794). A funding crisis in 1947 caused both projects to see reduced interest, and in the summer they were turned into long-term studies, with General Electric receiving $500,000 a year and the MARC $1,000,000 a year.

The Army Air Force and Ordnance Department had earlier split up programs based on whether they were "airplane like" or "rocket like", but Thumper and Wizard broke this rule and were developed under the AAF. Both projects moved to the Air Force when that force was created out of the Army Air Force in 1948. The Air Force cancelled Thumper in 1949, citing the overlap with the more advanced Wizard, and re-directed remaining funds to their GAPA anti-aircraft project. Wizard continued largely as a technology study with no actual hardware development.

=== Project Plato ===
Throughout this period the Army remained concerned about ballistic missile attack, as well as the need for some form of defensive system. In an 8 February 1950 memo to the Secretary of Defense, the Secretary of the Army admitted that there "was no guided missile or other device in sight for protection against enemy supersonic guided missiles" and that the problem was "the extreme technical difficult in meeting or overtaking a missile travelling at supersonic speed.". In light of this, an existing Signal Corp radar project and other development was defunded.

The Army continued to press for such a system and launched numerous research projects to develop working solutions. In addition to the radar work at the Signal Corps, in 1950 they started a study to see if the Bomarc missile might fill the role. Initial specifications for a mobile "Anti-Missile Missile" system for defense against ballistic missile attack were defined in 1951; This was followed by a September 1952 contract with the Aerophysics Development Corporation of Curtiss-Wright to study the overall system, and a November 1952 contract with the Signal Corps to once again consider the radar problem.

On 20 October 1952 when an Army G-4 meeting reiterated the need for such a system and initiated Project Plato to coordinate the various studies. When the Aerophysics report was returned on 15 May 1953 it gave them further impetus to research the radar systems, considered to the real problem, and sent out another contract to Bendix Aircraft in June 1953 to consider this. Their report returned in 1955 with the conclusion that the radar was possible.

Studies by Sylvania Electric Products in 1953 and the Cornell Aeronautical Laboratory in 1954 led to the conclusion, in May 1956, that such a project was feasible; Sylvania's design for the XSAM-A-19 missile was selected for development in September 1956. The XSAM-A-19 was expected to reach speeds of up to Mach 8; the issues with hypersonic control and thermodynamics were a major part of the project studies.

The project was partially announced to the public in February 1958, with it being announced that "Plato" was a mobile system that would use the Nike Zeus missile; in February 1959, before construction had begun on the prototype SAM-A-19 missiles, the project was canceled; the Nike Hercules surface-to-air missile would be adopted as an interim ABM. As of 2003, the official histories of Project Plato were still classified.

=== Cancellation ===
As the Plato missile was designed to fly at speeds of Mach 6 to 8, a relatively unknown area, most of the Plato work after 1956 was concerned with aerodynamic and thermodynamic studies. Plato studies continued until February 1959, when very little progress had been made. Reports early that year demonstrated a rapid buildup of short- and medium-range missiles and rockets in the Warsaw Pact forces. Although first identified as a threat over a decade earlier, it took considerable time for the expected problem to actually evolve. In spite of this long delay the Army was nowhere near ready to deploy the Plato system.

In something of a panic, the Army canceled Plato in favor of upgrades to the existing Hawk and Hercules missiles. This would be a stop-gap measure only, a true solution to the TBM problem was still needed.

== FABMDS ==
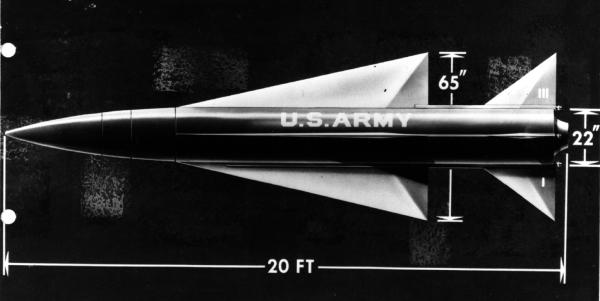
General Electric FABMDS

Despite the cancellation of Plato, the requirement for a definitive ABM system remained, and the Army started the Field Army Ballistic Missile Defense System project in September 1959. Studies of FABMDS were run through May 1960, and proposals for the project, which was defined as being fully mobile and capable of undertaking four simultaneous intercept with a 95% probability of kill (PK); in September 1961, General Electric's submission was judged the best of the proposals.

The proposed FABMDS was a large, solid-fueled missile, capable of intercepting theatre and medium-range ballistic missiles; 20 feet (6.1 m) in length with a diameter of 22 inches (560 mm), it was to be equipped with a nuclear warhead and could intercept incoming missiles at altitudes of up to 120,000 feet (37,000 m). By October 1962, however, the technology available was officially deemed incapable of producing a cost-effective system; in addition, the requirement had been altered to require capability for defense against aircraft, which was considered compromising to the effectiveness of the system against missile targets, and the FABMDS program was canceled. It was replaced by the Army Air Defense for the 1970s (AADS-70) program, which became Surface-to-Air Missile-Development (SAM-D) and eventually produced the MIM-104 Patriot missile system.
