= Nike Missile Site HM-69 =

- U.S. National Register of Historic Places
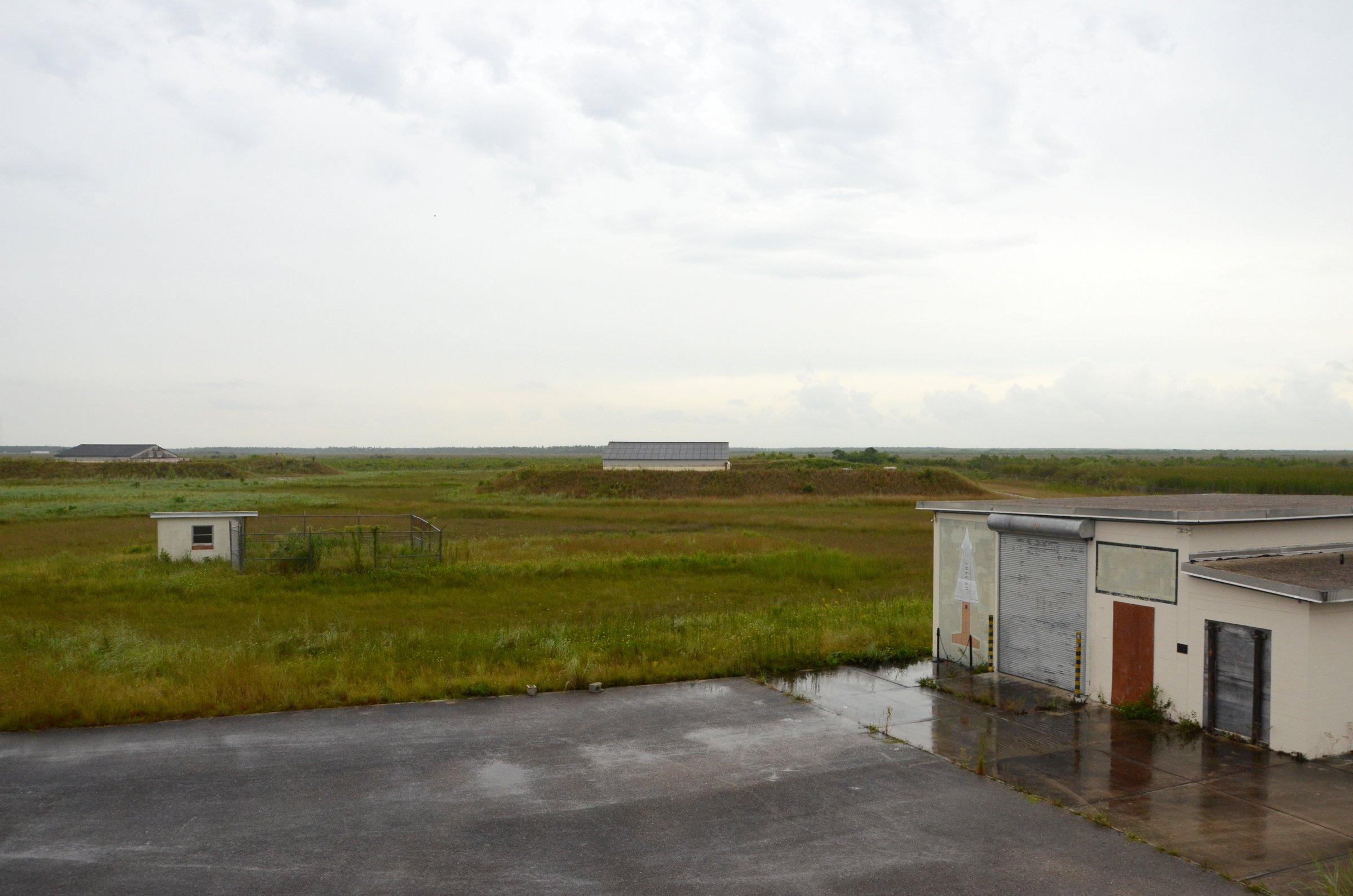
- HM-69

- Location within Florida Location within the United States
- Nearest city: Homestead, Florida
- Coordinates: 25.37361°N 80.68444°W
- Architect: U.S. Army Corps of Engineers
- NRHP reference No.: 04000758
- Designated NRHP: July 27, 2004

The Nike Missile Site HM-69 (also known as Hole in the Donut or Everglades Nike Site or Missile Base) is a former Nike-Hercules missile base, now listed as a historic site west of Homestead, Florida, United States. It is located on Long Pine Key Road in the Everglades National Park. The site with 22 buildings opened in 1964 and closed in 1979 when it was turned over to the National Park Service.

In April 1963 2nd Battalion, 52nd Air Defense Artillery Regiment fell under the Army Air Defense Command (ARADCOM) and it was decided to make the air defense sites in South Florida permanent. The battalion Headquarters and Headquarters Battery was moved to Homestead Air Force Base. Battery A was moved to the Everglades National Park HM-69 site.

== History and description ==
The Homestead-Miami Defense Area was established as a result of the Cuban Missile Crisis, and was the last fixed air defense missile system to remain in operation in the continental United States. HM-69 was the westernmost of the Nike-Hercules sites ringing Miami. The south Florida sites were unique in operating an anti-tactical ballistic missile version of the Nike-Hercules, intended to intercept missiles fired from Cuba. A portion of the district's missiles were armed with nuclear warheads.

The battery was initially stationed in temporary facilities from 1962 to 1965 just outside the park entrance at a site near State Road 9336. Construction of the completed Battery A, as it was known, was completed in 1964 in a portion of the park known as the "Hole in the Donut", formerly occupied by Iori Farms. The launch site consisted of three above-ground launch units, each with four missiles. Above-ground units were required in the Everglades due to the high water table. A mobile HIPAR radar unit provided radar coverage. The fire control site was located to the north and is used by the Park Service as the Daniel Beard Research Center.

== Preservation ==
On July 27, 2004, Battery A/HM-69 was added to the U.S. National Register of Historic Places. The National Park Service offers daily tours of the battery in the winter months. Remaining structures include a missile assembly building, three missile shelters, barracks and a guard dog kennel. A restored Nike-Hercules missile is on display at the site.

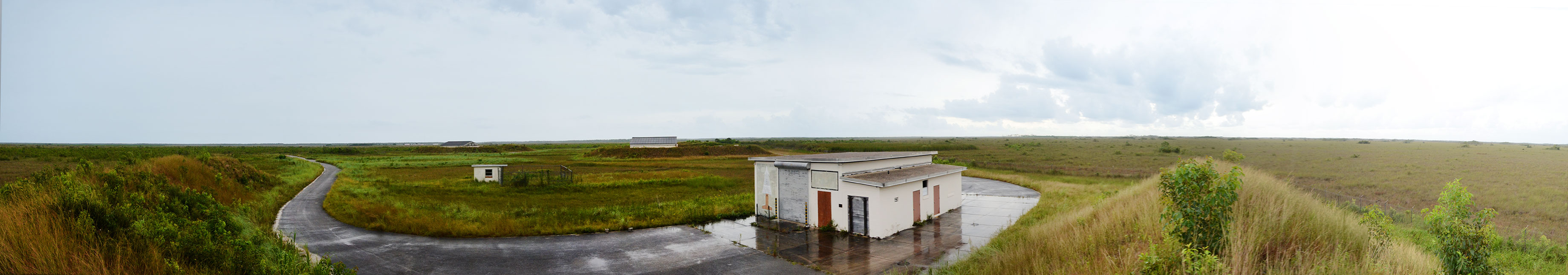
Nike Missile Site HM-69

== See also ==
- List of Nike missile sites
