= Nike Hercules =

Type of surface-to-air missile

MIM-14 Nike Hercules
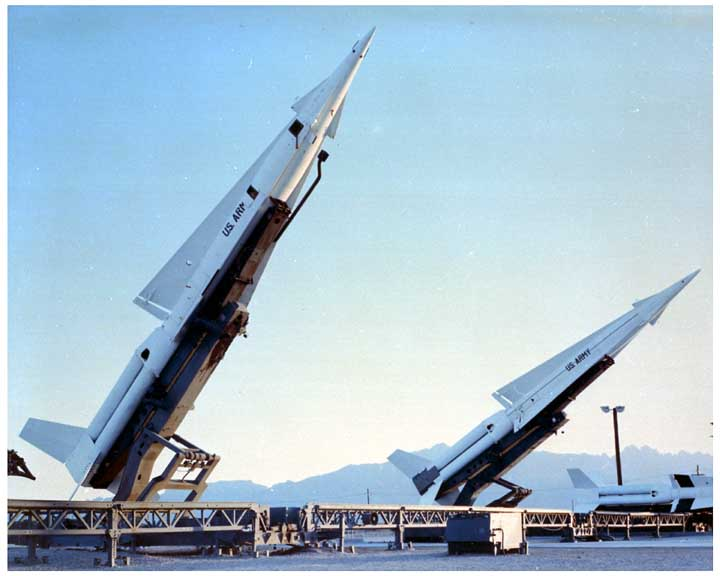
- Nike Hercules missile
- Type: Surface-to-air missile

Production history
- Manufacturer: Western Electric; Bell Laboratories; Douglas Aircraft Company
- Produced: 1958–1970s 1980s (upgrades)

Specifications
- Mass: 10,710 pounds (4,860 kg)
- Length: 41 feet (12 m) overall; 26 feet 10 inches (8.18 m) second stage
- Diameter: booster 31.5 inches (800 mm); second stage 21 inches (530 mm)
- Wingspan: 11 feet 6 inches (3.51 m) booster; 6 feet 2 inches (1.88 m) second stage
- Warhead: initially W7 (2.5 or 28 kt later W31 nuclear 2 kt (M-97) or 20 kt (M-22) or T-45 HE warhead weighing 1,106 pounds (502 kg) and containing 600 pounds (270 kg) of HBX-6 M17 blast-fragmentation
- Engine: Booster: Hercules M42 solid-fueled rocket cluster (4× M5E1 Nike boosters) 978 kilonewtons (220,000 lb_{f}); Sustainer: Thiokol M30 solid-fueled rocket 44.4 kilonewtons (10,000 lb_{f})
- Propellant: solid fuel
- Operational range: 90 miles (140 km)
- Flight ceiling: 100,000 feet (30,000 m)
- Maximum speed: >Mach 4 (3,045 mph; 4,900 km/h)
- Guidance system: command guidance

The Nike Hercules, initially designated SAM-A-25 and later MIM-14, was a surface-to-air missile (SAM) used by U.S. and NATO armed forces for medium- and high-altitude long-range air defense. It was normally armed with the W31 nuclear warhead, but could also be fitted with a conventional warhead for export use. Its warhead also allowed it to be used in a secondary surface-to-surface role, and the system also demonstrated its ability to hit other short-range missiles in flight.

Hercules was originally developed as a simple upgrade to the earlier MIM-3 Nike Ajax, allowing it to carry a nuclear warhead in order to defeat entire formations of high-altitude supersonic targets. It evolved into a much larger missile with two solid fuel stages that provided three times the range of the Ajax. Deployment began in 1958, initially at new bases, but it eventually took over many Ajax bases as well. At its peak, it was deployed at over 130 bases in the US alone.

Hercules was officially referred to as "transportable", but moving a battery was a significant operation and required considerable construction at the firing sites. Over its lifetime, significant effort was put into the development of solid state replacements for the vacuum tube-based electronics inherited from the early-1950s Ajax, and a variety of mobile options. None of these were adopted, in favor of much more mobile systems like the MIM-23 Hawk. Another development for the anti-ballistic missile role later emerged as the much larger LIM-49 Nike Zeus design. Hercules would prove to be the last operational missile from Bell's Nike team; Zeus was never deployed, and Hercules's replacements were developed by different teams.

Hercules remained the US's primary heavy SAM until it began to be replaced by the higher performance and considerably more mobile MIM-104 Patriot in the 1980s. Patriot's much higher accuracy allowed it to dispense with the nuclear warhead, and Hercules was the last US SAM to use this option. The last Hercules missiles were deactivated in Europe in 1988, without ever being fired in a military conflict.

== Development and deployment ==
=== Project Nike ===
During World War II, the US Army Air Force (USAAF) concluded that existing anti-aircraft guns, only marginally effective against existing generations of propeller-driven aircraft, would not be effective at all against the emerging jet-powered designs. Like the Germans and British before them, they concluded the only successful defence would be to use guided weapons.

As early as 1944 the US Army started exploring anti-aircraft missiles, examining a variety of concepts. They split development between the Army Air Force or the Ordnance Department based on whether or not the design "depend[ed] for sustenance primarily on the lift of aerodynamic forces" or "primary on the momentum of the missile". That is, whether the missile operated more like an aircraft (Air Force) or a bullet (Ordnance).

Official requirements were published in 1945; Bell Laboratories won the Ordnance contract for a short-range line-of-sight weapon under Project Nike, while a team of players led by Boeing won the contract for a long-range design known as Ground-to-Air Pilotless Aircraft, or GAPA. GAPA moved to the US Air Force when that branch was formed in 1947. In 1946, the USAAF also started two early research projects into anti-missile systems in Project Thumper (MX-795) and Project Wizard (MX-794).

In 1953, Project Nike delivered the world's first operational anti-aircraft missile system, known simply as Nike. Nike tracked both the target and the missile using separate radars, compared the locations in a computer, and sent commands to the missile to fly to a point in the sky to intercept the target. To increase range, the missile was normally boosted above the target into the thinner air and then descended on it in a gliding dive. Nike was initially deployed at military bases starting in 1953, especially Strategic Air Command bomber airfields, and general deployment then followed at US cities, important industrial sites, and then overseas bases. Similar systems quickly emerged from other nations, including the S-75 Dvina (SA-2) from the USSR, and the English Electric Thunderbird in the UK.

=== Ajax and Hercules ===
"The Nike Hercules Story" (1960) de-classified official Nike Hercules and Ajax information film reel.

Even as the Nike was undergoing testing, planners grew concerned about the missile's ability to attack formations of aircraft. Given the low resolution of the tracking radars available at the time, a formation of aircraft would appear on the radars as a single larger return. Launched against such a formation, the Nike would fly towards the center of the composite return. Given the Nike warhead's relatively small lethal radius, if the missile flew into the middle of the formation and exploded, it would be highly unlikely to destroy any of the aircraft.

Improving performance against such targets would require either much higher resolution radars or much larger warheads. Of the two, the warhead seemed like the simplest problem to address. Like almost any thorny military problem of the 1950s, the solution was the application of nuclear bombs. In May 1952, Bell was asked to explore such an adaptation to the Nike. They returned two design concepts.

"Nike Ajax" used a slightly modified Nike missile, largely a re-arrangement of the internal components, making room for the 15 kt (63 TJ) WX-9 "gun-type" warhead also being developed as an artillery round. The WX-9, like all gun-type designs, was long and thin, originally designed to be fired from an 11 in (280 mm) artillery piece, and easily fit within the Nike fuselage.

The competing implosion-type design is considerably more efficient and uses much less nuclear fuel to reach any given explosive power. Bell proposed a much more modified design known as "Nike Hercules" with an enlarged upper fuselage able to carry the XW-7 warhead of up to 40 kt (170 TJ) that wouldn't fit in the existing fuselage. Despite the greatly increased explosive power, the WX-7 was only slightly heavier than the WX-9, about 950 lb (430 kg) for common XW-7 versions, as opposed to 850 lb (390 kg) for the XW-9.

At the same time, there were increasing concerns that higher speed aircraft would be able to launch their warheads at the extreme range of the Nike bases. This was a common complaint by the Air Force, who noted that bombers had the ability to attack from as much as 50 miles (80 km) while the Nike was only comfortable launching at about 25 miles (40 km). This could be increased even further using stand-off missiles, like those currently under development by all of the nuclear-armed forces for just this reason. (Note: Examples include the US's AGM-28 Hound Dog, the UK's Blue Steel, and the USSR's Kh-20.) A larger Nike with greatly improved range would not only help address this sort of attack, but also allow a single base to defend a much larger area, lowering the overall costs of deploying a widespread defensive system.

As the larger Hercules would be easier to adapt to a longer-range form, the Army selected it as the winning design. Bell began working on the new design in concert with the Nike partners, Western Electric and Douglas Aircraft Company. Instead of the basic W-7, development started on an improved 20 kt (84 TJ) boosted fission design known as W31. This used much less fissile material and was thus considerably less expensive. Developed by Sandia Laboratories in Albuquerque and at Los Alamos, it was given 1A priority by the Joint Chiefs of Staff in March 1953.

=== Solid fuel ===
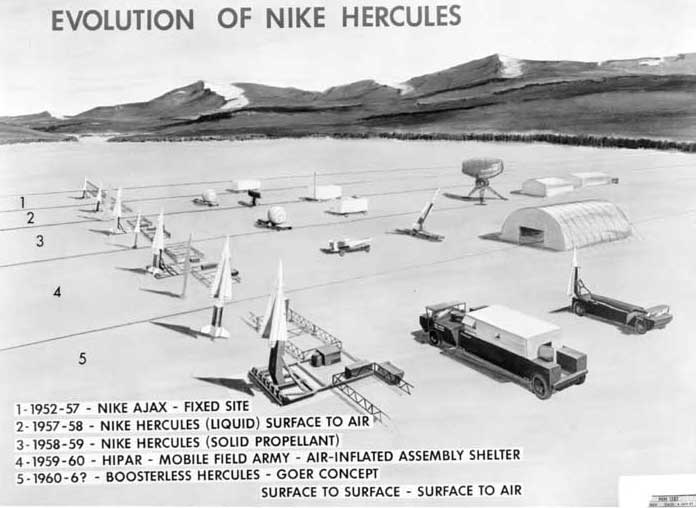
This image shows the evolution of the Hercules and its associated launch systems as it replaced Ajax. Note the growth of the fuselage as it moved to solid fuel.

Soon after design work started, the Army requested that the existing liquid fuel engine be replaced with a solid fuel design, for a variety of reasons. Primary among these was that the Ajax fuels were hypergolic, igniting on contact. Due to the nature of these fuels, extreme caution had to be used whenever the missiles were moved or unloaded for maintenance. This was carried out in a protected area behind a large berm, in order to protect the rest of the site from an accidental explosion during fueling. This complexity added enormously to the cost and time required to maintain the missiles.

Solid fuel rockets can remain stored for years and are generally very difficult to ignite without an extended period of applied flame. This means they can be manhandled safely and maintained with the rocket motor installed. However, the lower specific impulse of these engines, combined with the requirement for longer range, demanded a much larger fuselage to store the required fuel. Hercules, still known officially as Nike B at this point, (Note: It is not clear in existing sources why the design was named "Nike B" and not "Nike IB", given that the Nike Zeus was known as "Nike II".) grew to become a much larger design. This, in turn, required a much larger booster to loft it. Design of such a booster started, but this was instead solved by strapping together four of the existing Nike boosters to form a cluster known as the XM-42. The only modification to the original M5 engine design was the addition of new holes to bolt them together, creating the M5E.

During this period, some effort was put into a frangible booster for the Ajax. Ajax's boosters were housed in steel tubes that fell near the base, presenting a serious range safety concern. Martin produced the T48E1 and E2 designs for Ajax used a fiberglass casing that was destroyed by small explosives, but this proved overweight and did not boost the Ajax to the required speed. Redstone Arsenal then presented the T48E3 which was somewhat larger and longer to reach reasonable performance, but only at the cost of having to modify all of the Ajax launcher rails. The Army eventually decided not to proceed with any Ajax modifications as Hercules would be arriving shortly anyway. Similar experiments for Hercules boosters led to the XM-61 single-chamber booster, but when the XM-42 cluster proved to be even less expensive than expected, this effort was also dropped.

As part of the upgrade project, the original missile became known as Nike I. On 15 November 1956, the new missile was officially renamed as the Nike Hercules, as part of DA Circular 700-22, while the Nike I became Nike Ajax.

The new design ultimately provided effective ranges on the order of 75 miles (65 nmi; 121 km) and altitudes ranging from 20,000 to 100,000 feet (6,100 to 30,500 m). Minimum range had a ground radius of approximately 10,000 yards (30,000 ft; 9,100 m) and an altitude of approximately 20,000 feet (6,100 m).

=== Bomarc / Hercules controversy ===
Throughout the early Nike evolution, the then-new Air Force had been encouraged by the deployment of the missile systems. They saw this as an extension of the Army's existing "point defence" role, and as a valuable backup to their own manned interceptors. There were concerns about the possibility of Air Force fighters being attacked by Army missiles, but the two forces improved co-ordination between the Army's ARAACOM and the Air Force's Air Defense Command (ADC) to the point where it was no longer a serious concern. Nevertheless, when the Army first released information about Ajax to the press in 1953, the Air Force quickly responded by leaking information about BOMARC to Aviation Week, and continued to denigrate Nike in the press over the next few years.

Things changed dramatically with the development of Hercules. By the early 1950s, the Air Force was still struggling with their own long-range weapon systems, originally started in the 1940s in the GAPA project. The project had moved several times, and was now in late development as the BOMARC. BOMARC proved extremely expensive, difficult to maintain in operational readiness, had questionable performance, and was displaying a continued inability to reach operational status. Instead of de-emphasizing BOMARC in favor of Hercules, inter-service rivalry became rampant, and the Air Force began a policy of denigrating Hercules and the Army using policy by press release.

In a famous event, the Air Force interviewed for an article that appeared in the New York Times entitled "Air Force Calls Army Nike Unfit To Guard Nation". This was answered most forcibly not by the Army, but the Defense Secretary Charles Erwin Wilson, who wrote in Newsweek that "one hard solid fact remerges above them all: no matter what the Nike is or isn't, it's the only land-based operational anti-aircraft missile that the U.S. has." By the time early Hercules deployments were starting in 1958, BOMARC was still nowhere near operational.

All of this was part of a larger fight going on over the Army's Jupiter missile, which the Air Force stated should be their mission. Wilson attempted to address the inter-service rivalries by enforcing a strict limit on the range of Army systems. In his 26 November 1956 memorandum, he limited the Army to weapons with 200-mile (320 km) range, and those involved in ground-to-air defense to only 100 miles (160 km). This forced the Army to turn its Jupiter IRBM systems to the Air Force, and to limit the range of their ABM developments.

This did not do much to stop the squabbling, nor did it solve the problems that led to the issues in the first place – the fight over Hercules and BOMARC and related anti-missile developments. Nor did it stop the fighting in the press. Army Colonel John C. Nickerson Jr. publicly denounced Wilson, while leaking details of their latest missile design, the Pershing missile. The resulting flap led to calls for Nickerson to be court-martialed and was compared to the Billy Mitchell court-martial in the 1920s.

It did, however, allow development of Hercules to continue, and the system was soon preparing to deploy. In 1958 an article appeared in the Chicago Sun-Times in which various Air Force officials complained that the Hercules was ineffective. Chicago was slated to shortly begin receiving its Hercules upgrades. Similar articles began appearing in papers around the country, invariably just before that city was to begin receiving their missiles. This prompted ARAACOM commander Charles E. Hart to petition the Secretary of Defense to order the Air Force to stop the well organized campaign against Hercules. The Army then began its own series of press releases under what they called "Project Truth".

Eventually, in November the new Secretary of Defense, Neil H. McElroy announced both systems would be purchased. Both forces, and their congressional supporters, realized that splitting the budget would mean neither force would be funded to the level required to fulfill the defence mission. In 1959 both the House and Senate debated the systems, with the Senate recommending cutting funding for Hercules and the House stating the opposite. The House eventually came to support the Defense Secretary's position as stated in the Master Air Defense Plan, retaining Hercules while reducing BOMARC and SAGE.

Meanwhile, the Air Force scrambled to bring BOMARC to operational status, and on 1 September 1959 declared the 46th Air Defense Squadron at McGuire Air Force Base operational. It was later revealed that only one of the 60 missiles at the site was actually functional at that time. Engineers continued work on getting a second missile operational at McGuire, but the Air Force went ahead with plans to open the Suffolk County Missile Annex by 1 January 1960. In January, only four missiles were operational at Suffolk, and during House appropriation hearings that month, the DoD proved rather subdued when Congress attacked the design, especially in light of several failed tests of the BOMARC B missile. In February, Air Force Chief of Staff Thomas D. White shocked everyone when he requested that BOMARC deployments be reduced to eight US and two Canadian sites, essentially killing the program.

In the aftermath of the Hercules/BOMARC debates, retired Army Brigadier General Thomas R. Phillips wrote an article for the St. Louis Post-Dispatch that BOMARC and SAGE had been the "most costly waste of funds in the history of the Defense Department."

=== Operation SNODGRASS ===
Plans had been made to test the Hercules's W-7 warhead in a live-fire exercise in 1959 as part of "Operation SNODGRASS". However, as rumours of a ban on atmospheric testing of nuclear weapons spread, SNODGRASS became a crash project to be completed before 1 September 1958 at any available site – the Nevada Test Site was fully booked with the existing Project AMMO testing series. Part of the rush was due to the newly evolving understanding of the effects of nuclear weapons on radar systems, which led to serious concerns about various weapon's systems ability to operate after nearby nuclear explosions. Testing of the W-7 was put into AMMO, while the SNODGRASS series was moved to an Army-Air Force test at Eglin Air Force Base with tests of both the conventional T45 and nuclear W-7 warheads. A variety of problems, including one found in the W-7 warhead, caused delays in the testing programs, so a single launch of the T45-equipped Hercules was also added to the AMMO project.

The AMMO shot took place on 1 July 1958, successfully intercepting a simulated 650-knot (750 mph; 1,200 km/h) target flying at an altitude of 100,000 feet (30,000 m) and a slant range of 79 miles (69 nmi; 127 km). (Note: The "simulated target" appears to be purely simulated, not a drone.) The first SNODGRASS round was launched on 14 July with its warhead replaced by an instrument package and launched against a 350-knot (400 mph; 650 km/h) Q2A Ryan Firebee I drone. A similar test on 17 July against a 300-knot (350 mph; 560 km/h) Q2A destroyed the target with the T45. A dual-launch followed on 24 July, with the first round destroying its target with the T45, and the second with the instrument package flying one second behind. A similar test on 29 July launched two missiles against three F-80 Shooting Star drones flying in formation, the first missile destroyed the lead aircraft while the second passed within lethal range of a second. Testing was unexpectedly cancelled before the W-7 could be fired.

=== Deployment ===
Hercules was designed from the start to operate from Ajax bases. However, as it protected a much greater area, not as many sites were needed to provide coverage of potential targets. Early deployments starting in 1958 were on new sites, but Ajax units started converting as well. Conversions were largely complete by 1960, leaving only a few Ajax sites in use. The last active Nike Ajax batteries were relieved of their mission in December 1961, followed by the last Army National Guard unit in May 1964.

Nuclear-armed Nike Hercules missiles were deployed in the United States, Greece, Italy, Korea and Turkey, and with Belgian, Dutch, and U.S. forces in West Germany. Conventionally armed Nike Hercules missiles also served in the United States, Spain, Germany, Denmark, Japan, Norway, and Taiwan. The first deployments in Europe began in 1959.

=== Improved Nike Hercules ===
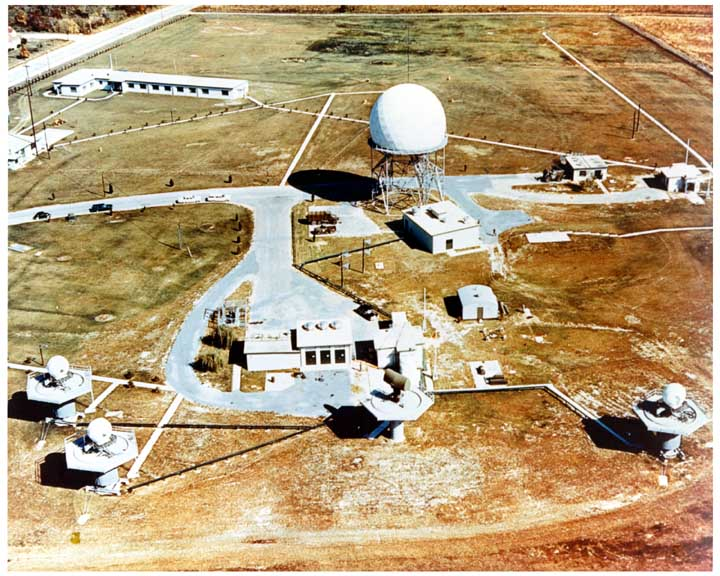
The IFC area of an Improved Nike Hercules site mounts its five radars on platforms for a better view. From left to right are the TTR and TRR, HIPAR (large white dome) LOPAR (small dark rectangle in center foreground) and MTR.

Even before deployment of Hercules began, studies on improvements to the system had been identified. A 23 October 1954 report stated that "Concurrent with the prosecution of the NIKE I and NIKE B programs, studies and research and development must be conducted to insure that the NIKE equipment is modernized to the maximum extent within the limits of current technology and economics of improvement as compared to investment in a new system ...". Three key elements were identified; the need to attack formations without nuclear warheads, operations against low-altitude targets, and better traffic-handling capabilities to handle larger raids.

In early 1956, Bell began studies of the Improved Nike Hercules (INH) concept by considering the predicted threat for the 1960-65 period. This was aircraft with speeds up to Mach 3, a wide range of radar cross sections, and powerful electronic countermeasures. IRBMs and ICBMs were also a consideration, but these were being addressed by the Nike Zeus concept, leaving only short-range weapons as an issue Hercules might need to address. To address this whole range of issues, Bell proposed a series of changes:

1. improvements to the X-band TTR/MTR radars to increase range
2. the addition of the long-range L-band "High Power Acquisition Radar" (HIPAR) to detect small, high-speed targets
3. the addition of the wide-frequency Ku-band Target Ranging Radar (TRR) to provide ranging in a heavy ECM environment
4. the addition of an active seeker on the missile to improve performance against low-altitude targets

The addition of the TRR solved a problem with early pulse radar units. It is relatively easy to jam a conventional radar by sending out additional pulses of radio signal on the same frequency. Unless the transmitter has encoded some additional form of information in the signal, the receiver cannot determine which pulse it sent out and which is from the jammer. Note that this has no effect on the determination of the direction to the target, which is the same for both the original and jammer pulses. However, it makes the determination of range difficult or impossible. The TRR solves this problem by providing a separate ranging system on another frequency. By making the signal wide-frequency, the jammer has to likewise broadcast across a similar bandwidth, limiting the energy in any one frequency and allowing the operator to tune the receiver to find an unjammed band. Combining range from the TRR and direction from the TTR provided complete information on the target.

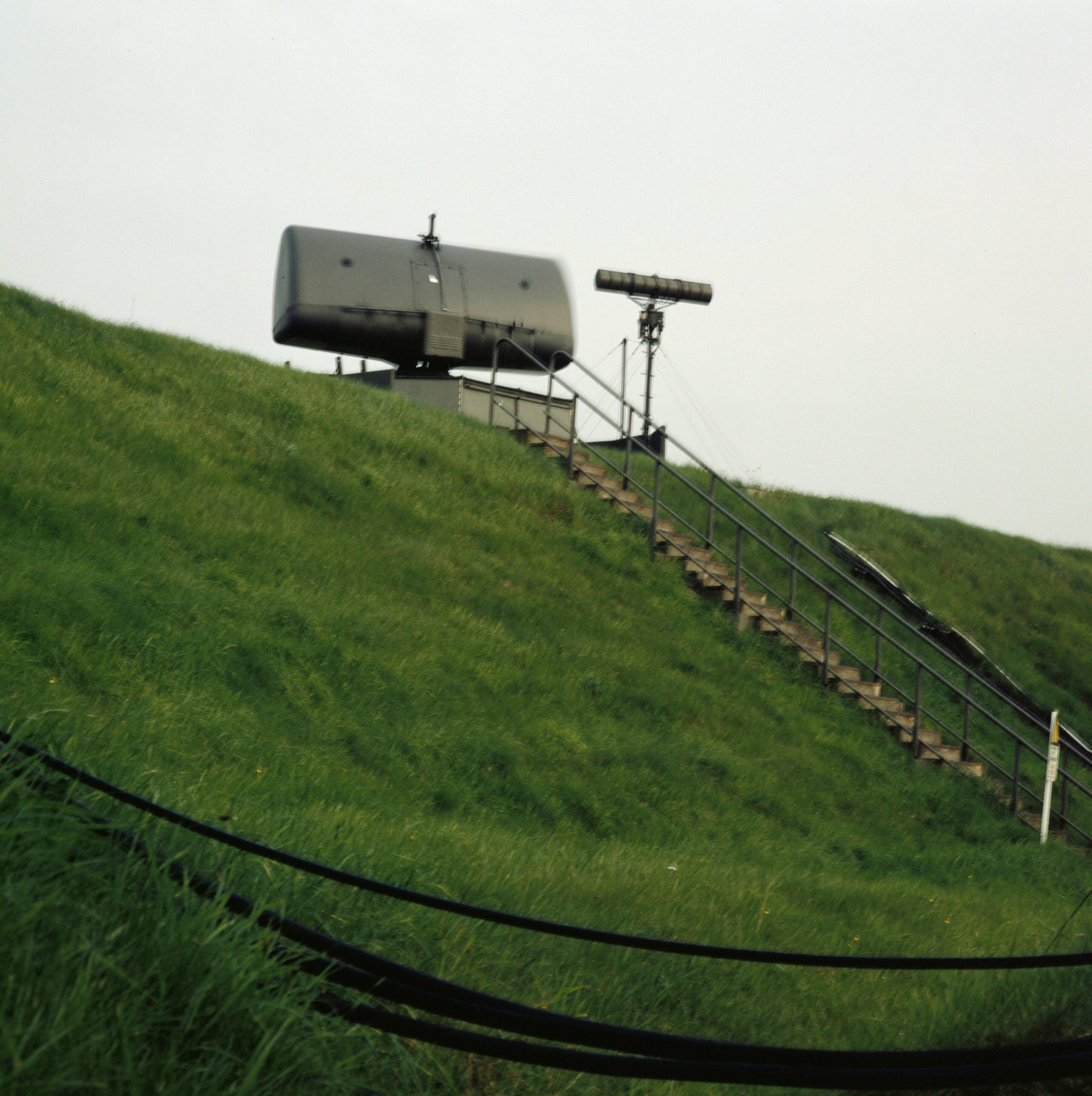
The antennae of the LOPAR radar component (originally, the Ajax detection radar) and IFF interrogator.

The changes were designed to be upgradable without major changes to the deployed system – the TTR/MTR could be replaced at any time, the HIPAR used its own displays and therefore required no changes in the missile launch equipment, the TRR was slaved to the TTR and simply updated range readings, and the new seeker could be retrofitted at any time. The original Ajax detection radar retroactively became known as LOPAR, and remained in use as the main target selection radar in the missile control van. HIPAR would detect targets separately and "hand off" to the LOPAR and TTR so those systems could remain largely unchanged and able to launch either Hercules or Ajax.

These changes were presented on 24 August 1956, and accepted by both CONARC and ARADCOM. The active seeker system was later dropped to lower costs. Engineering was complete in 1958 and entered low-rate production in May 1959. The first HIPAR was tested at White Sands between 14 April 1960 and 13 April 1961, starting with two Ajax launches that passed 14 yards and 18 yards from the drone targets, and a further 17 Hercules launches that were generally successful. Among the various test targets were a Mach 3 Lockheed AQM-60, a drone, and a Corporal missile. Also conducted were tests to evaluate ECM performance, two surface-to-surface tests, and two Hercules-on-Hercules attacks with the target Hercules flying in a semi-ballistic trajectory.

Deployment of the INH upgrade kits began on 10 June 1961 at the BA-30 site in the Washington–Baltimore defense area, and continued into September 1967. HIPAR was a large system and generally deployed under a dome on top of a concrete platform that raised it above any local obstructions. To provide the same range of view, the tracking radars were also often placed on concrete platforms of their own, although these were much smaller.

The Hercules missile systems sold to Japan (Nike J) were subsequently fitted with upgraded internal guidance systems, the original vacuum tube systems being replaced with transistorized ones.

=== Anti-missile upgrades ===
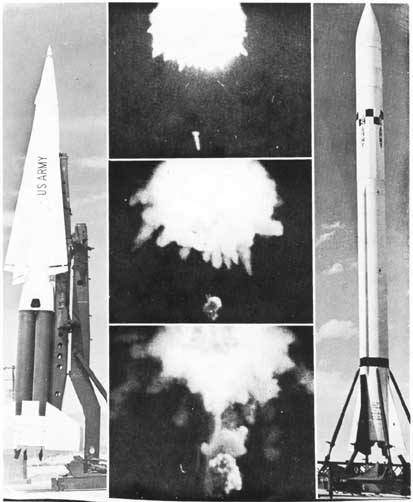
A Corporal missile engaged by a Nike Hercules in a test at White Sands, 3 June 1960

Although Hercules had demonstrated its ability to successfully engage short-range missiles, the capability was not considered very important. During development the Air Force continued its Project Wizard while the Army started its Project Plato studies for dedicated anti-missile systems. By 1959, Plato was still very much a paper project when news of large deployments of short-range missiles in the Warsaw Bloc became a clear threat. Plato was cancelled in February 1959, replaced in the short term by further upgrades to Hercules, and in the longer term by the FABMDS program. FABMDS would have performance against any credible "theatre" ranged missile or rocket system, as well as offer anti-aircraft capabilities, the ability to attack four targets at once, and be relatively mobile.

The Hercules system was compared to threats ranging from the relatively short-range Little John, Honest John and Lacrosse through medium-range systems like Corporal, Sergeant and Lance, and finally the long-range (for battlefield concerns) 200 miles (320 km) Redstone. Of these threats, Redstone was considered just within the Hercules's capabilities, able to defend against such a target over a relatively limited range. Increasing performance against these longer-range "theatre" weapons would require more extensive upgrades that would have pushed the time-frame out to the range when FABMDS was expected.

The primary change to create the resulting "Improved EFS/ATBM Hercules" was a modified version of the HIPAR. The antenna was modified to give it the ability to see higher angles, while the Battery Control Console was upgraded with dual PPI displays for short- and long-range work, and the data link to the missile van was upgraded. Additionally the radar was given the "Electronic Frequency Selection" (EFS) system which allowed operators to quickly switch between a selection of operating frequencies at about 20 microseconds, while the earlier system required manual switching that took about 30 seconds.

The first EFS sets arrived at White Sands late in 1962 and started testing in April 1963. In testing the system was successful against all manner of short-range rockets and missiles, and successfully tracked the Redstone on 23 September and 5 October 1963, but failed to achieve a "kill" in either test due to unrelated problems. A test against the much higher performance Pershing was carried out on 16 October 1963, and while the HIPAR was able to detect the missile, the tracking system was unable to track it.

The first deployment of the EFS/ATBM HIPAR was carried out between February and 20 April 1963, but during this time the Army decided not to deploy these systems in the United States. Further deployments to allied units and US units in Alaska were carried out between November 1963 and the summer of 1965.

=== Mobile Hercules ===
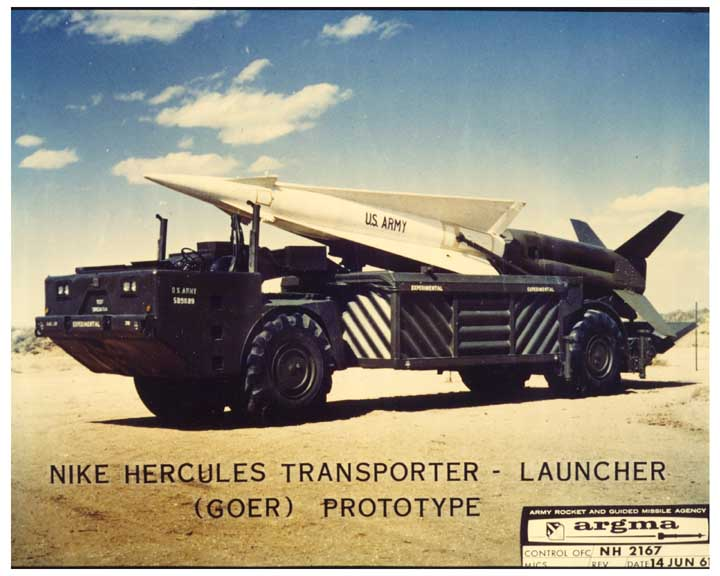
Considerable work on a mobile launcher was carried out using a modified GOER vehicle.

As Hercules had evolved from the fixed-base Ajax system, early deployments offered no mobility. However, both Ajax and Hercules systems in Europe had to be able to move as US forces shifted. This led to the use of semi-trailer systems for the fire control systems, which could be easily moved and re-positioned as required. LOPAR was relatively small, and the TTR/MTR were always trailer based, so these systems were also fairly mobile. The problem was the missile launcher itself, and especially the large HIPAR radar, which presented a formidable mobility problem.

Starting in April 1960, considerable effort was put into a fully mobile "Cross-Country Hercules" launcher based on the M520 Goer vehicle, an articulated prime mover that saw considerable service during the Vietnam War. This system was successfully tested at White Sands on 1 October 1961. However, efforts to mount the HIPAR on the same platform between March and December 1962 were not nearly as successful, and on 18 December 1962 the concept was abandoned.

Instead, the system was then used in an "airmobile" solution using conventional M52 tractor trucks and modified trailers. The resulting system used six semi-trailers: four to carry HIPAR electronic gear, one to carry the antenna, and one to carry the generators. General Electric demonstrated a prototype on 11 February 1964. The AN/MPQ-43 Mobile HIPAR was made part of Hercules Standard A in August 1966 and began operational deployment in Europe on 12 April 1967.

=== Deactivation ===
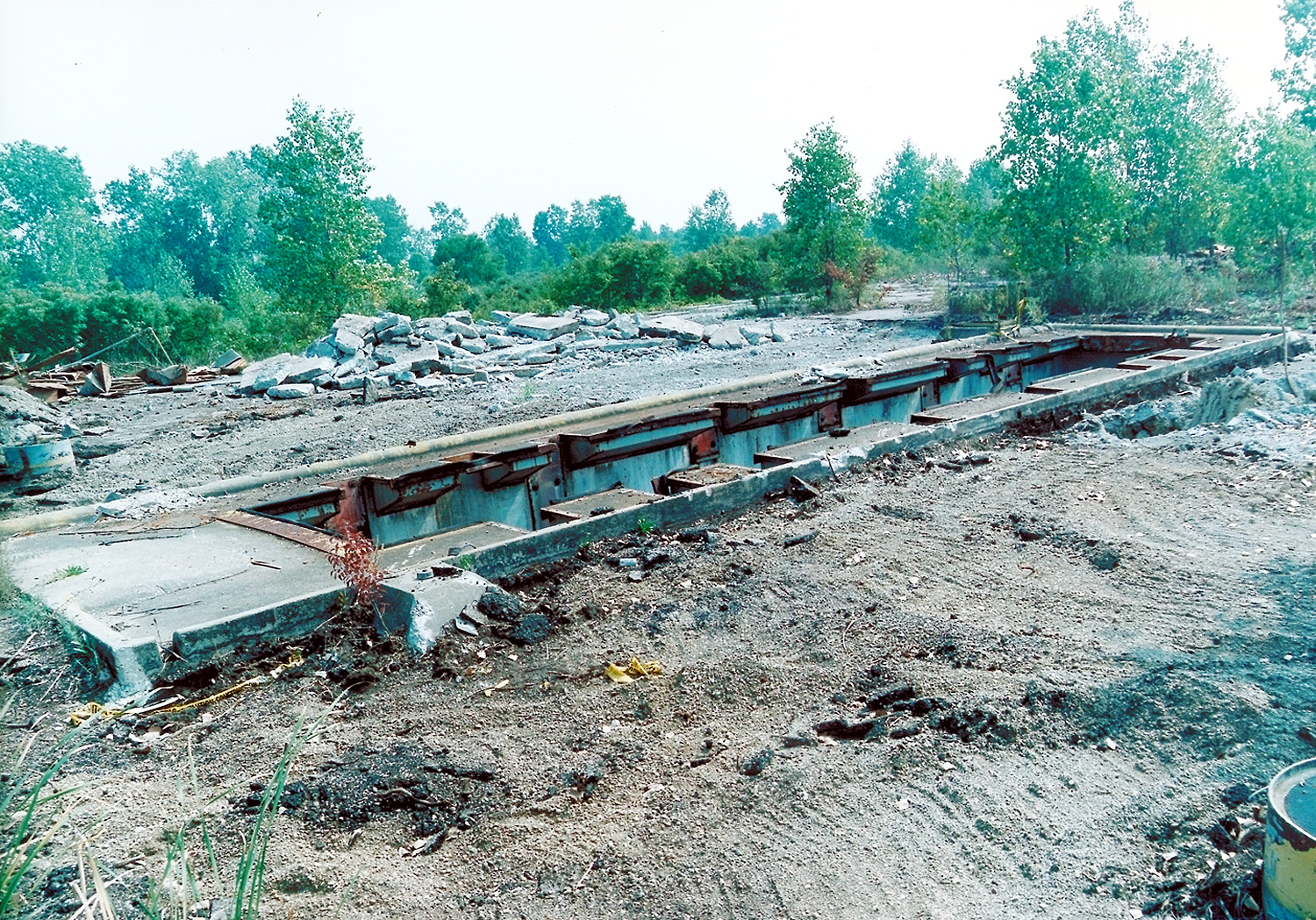
The remains of former Nike site D-57/58 in Newport, Michigan. At the time this picture was taken in 1996, the site was a hazardous waste cleanup site.

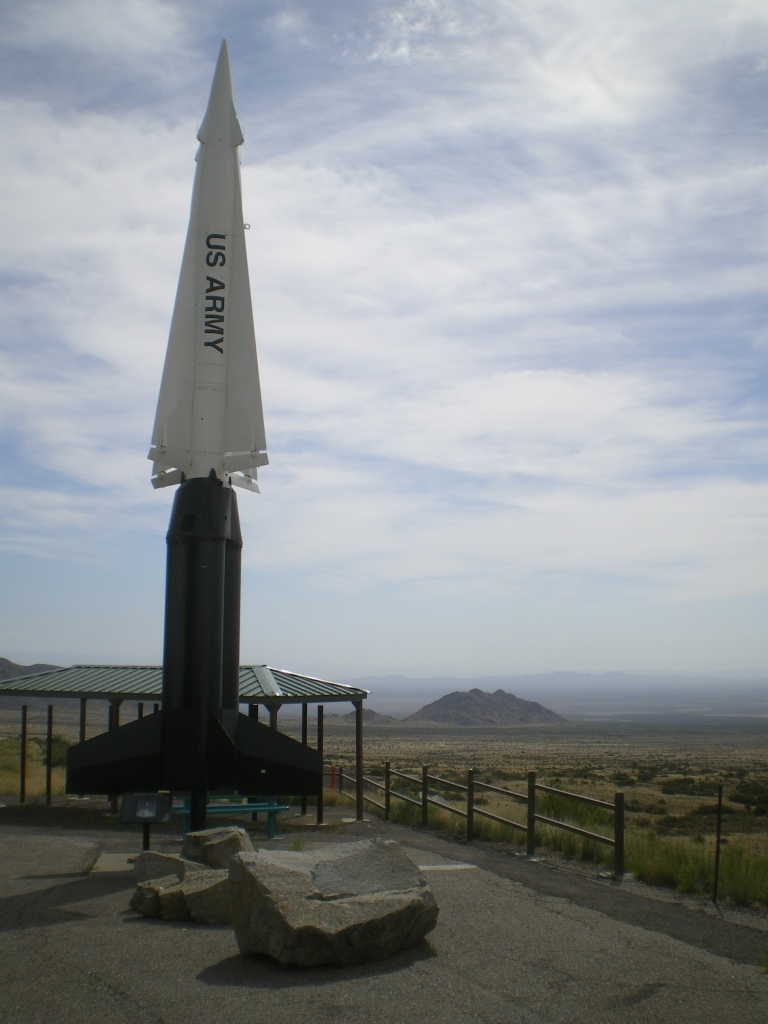
A relic Nike as a monument near the U.S. Route 70 entry to White Sands Missile Range, New Mexico in 2009

Soviet development of ICBMs and the de-emphasis of their bomber force decreased the value of the Hercules system. Beginning around 1965, the number of Nike batteries was reduced. Thule's air defense was reduced during 1965, and SAC air base defense during 1966, reducing the number of batteries to 112. Budgetary cuts reduced that number to 87 in 1968, and 82 in 1969. Nike Hercules was included in SALT I discussions as an ABM.

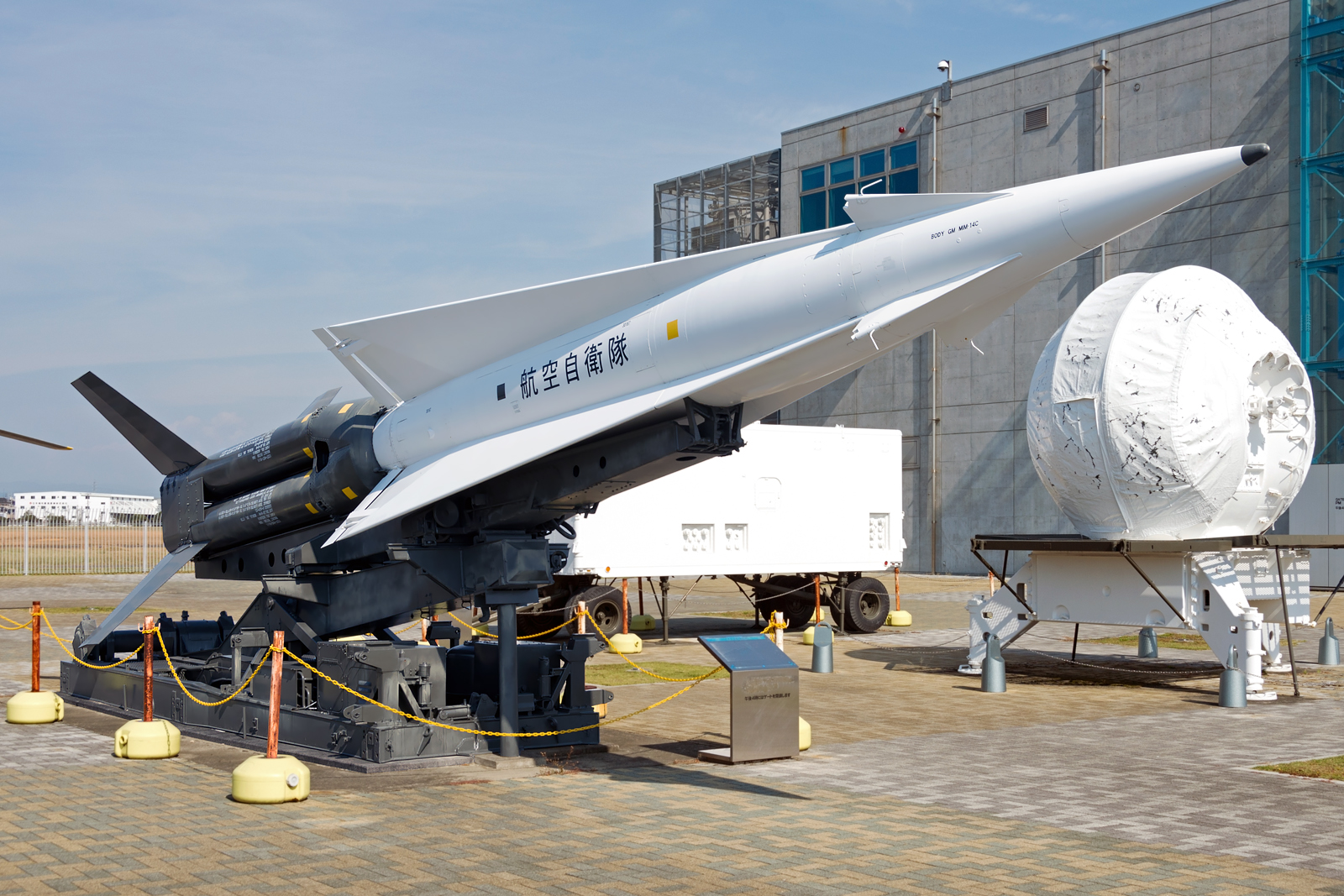
MIM-14C on display at JASDF Museum Hamamatsu

All CONUS Hercules batteries, with the exception of the ones in Florida and Alaska, were deactivated by April 1974. The remaining units were deactivated during the spring of 1979. Dismantling of the sites in Florida – Alpha Battery in Everglades National Park, Bravo Battery in Key Largo, Charlie Battery in Carol City and Delta Battery, located on Krome Avenue on the outskirts of Miami – started in June 1979 and was completed by early autumn of that year. The buildings that once housed Delta Battery became the original structures used for the Krome Avenue Detention Facility, a federal facility used primarily to hold illegal aliens awaiting immigration hearings. In Anchorage, Alaska, Site Point (A Battery) was converted into a ski chalet for Kincaid Park. Site Summit (B Battery) still sits above Eagle River, its IFC buildings and clamshell towers easily visible when driving towards Anchorage. Site Bay (C Battery), across Cook Inlet from the others, has been mostly demolished, with only burned out shells of the batteries remaining, as well as a few storage bunkers. The large airstrip remains, and is often used by locals for flight instruction and practice.

Hercules remained a major front-line weapon in Europe into the 1980s. Over the years, the vacuum-tube guidance system, as well as the complex fire control systems' radars, suffered from diminishing manufacturing source (DMS) issues. In part because of less parts supportability, Western European (Fourth Allied Tactical Air Force (4 ATAF) and Second Allied Tactical Air Force (2 ATAF) sites essentially became fixed sites and were no longer considered capable of a mobile role. During the last years of their deployment in Europe, the issue at hand was more about maintaining security of the nuclear capable missiles, rather than mobility. The DoD invested considerably in upgrading the security of the storage areas of the launcher sections, ultimately installing significant towers that were capable of watching over all three sections within the "exclusion area".

The U.S. Army continued to use Hercules as a front-line air defense weapon in Europe until 1983, when Patriot missile batteries were deployed. NATO units from West Germany, the Netherlands, Denmark, Belgium, Norway, Greece and Turkey continued to use the Hercules for high-altitude air defense until the late 1980s. With the collapse of communism in Eastern Europe, the units were deactivated in 1988. The last Hercules missile was launched in the Sardinian range of Capo San Lorenzo in Italy on November 24, 2006.

Approximately 25,000 Nike Hercules were manufactured. Early models cost about US$55,250 each, while most recent cost estimate, from Japan, was US$3.0 million.

== Description ==
The Nike Hercules was a command-guided, long-range, high-altitude anti-aircraft missile. It was normally deployed in fixed bases with a central radar and control site (Integrated Fire Control area or IFC) separated from the launcher area (LA). Hercules batteries in the US were generally placed in older Ajax bases, using their underground storage and maintenance buildings. 145 missile batteries were deployed during the Cold War.

=== Sites ===
Each Nike battery consisted of two or three areas: IFC, LA, and general. The LA consisted to a maximum of four launching sections, each section consisted of an underground storage area, an elevator to move missiles to and from the surface launchers, and four aboveground firing locations. One of these locations was directly above the elevator, the others were reached by manually pushing the missiles off the elevator to the launcher along rails. The LA also had a control van to control and monitor the LA activities and maintenance facilities.

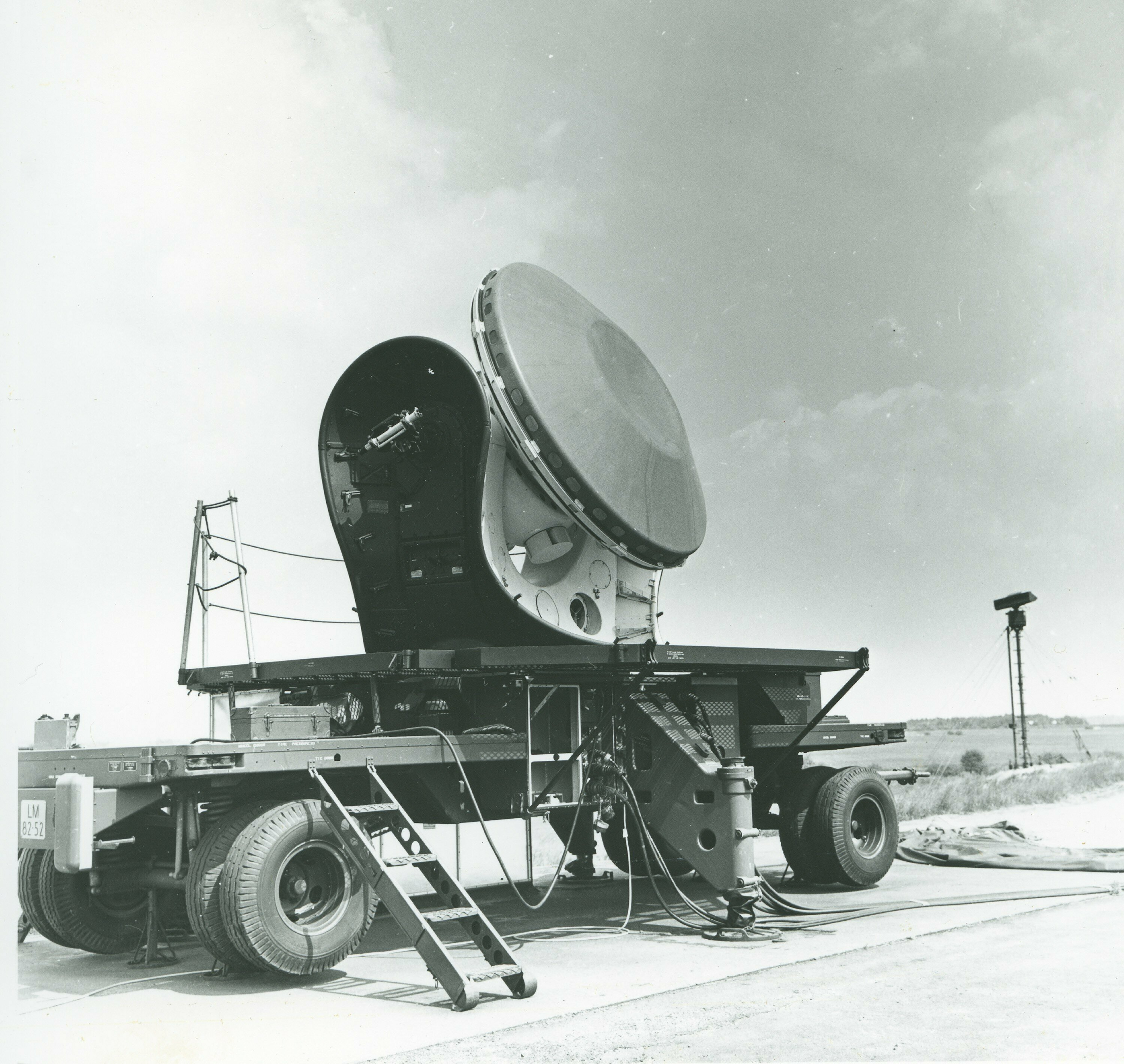
Tracking radar of the Nike Hercules system on its own trailer

The IFC contained the search and tracking radars and control center (operators, computer, etc.), and various related offices and communications centres for general operations. To operate the Nike Hercules system on the IFC the crew consisted of about nine operators under command of the Battery Control Officer (BCO). The crew on the LA, also under command of the BCO, was responsible for preparing and erecting the missile. On both the IFC and the LA maintenance people were available.

The battery crew was housed on-site, either at the IFC, or sometimes, together with administrative offices and general services on a separate area.

Any single battery could only launch a single missile at a time, due to the limited number of radars, computers and operators. Four Nike batteries were normally organized into a single battalion.

=== Missile ===
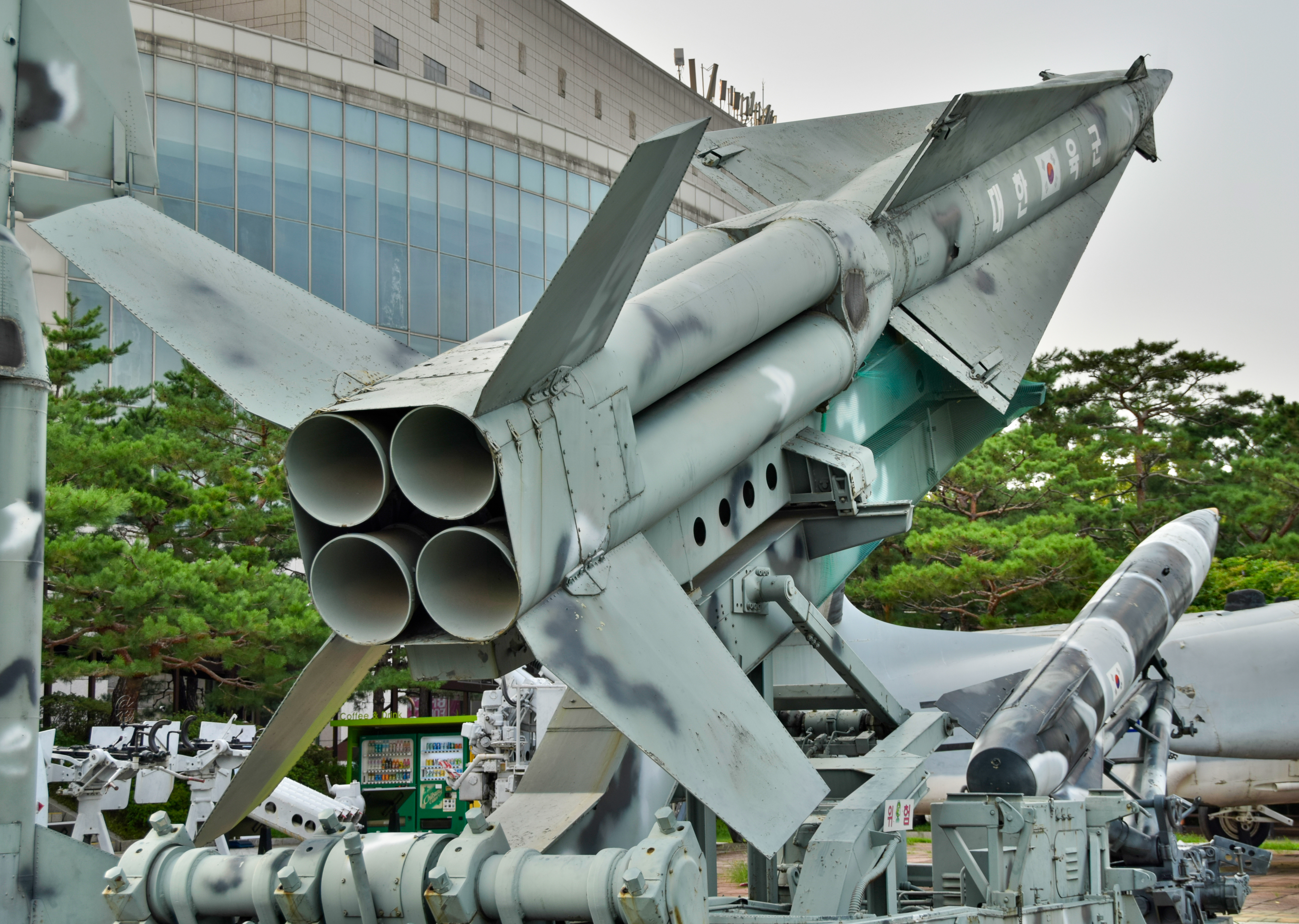
The four Ajax M5E1 boosters of the missile

When mounted on its booster pack, the Hercules missile was 41 feet 6 inches (12.65 m) long with a wingspan of 6 feet 2 inches (1.88 m) (one side only). The upper stage alone was 24 feet 11 inches (7.59 m) long. The fuselage had a bullet-like shape (Sears–Haack body), but this was difficult to make out due to the presence of the four large delta wings running almost the entire length of the fuselage. Each wing ended with a control flap which was separated from the wing by a short distance, leaving a gap. The back of the controls were even with the extreme rear of the missile. Smaller deltas in front of the main wings, and blended into them, provided roll control with very small flaps mounted to pivot along a line roughly 45 degrees from the line of the fuselage. These smaller wings also housed the antennae of the transponder.

The booster was formed from four of the earlier Ajax M5E1 boosters held together in a frame. Each of these was a steel tube, and held together in this fashion they presented a considerable range safety issue when they fell back to the ground after launch. The boosters were equipped with four large swept-wing fins at the extreme rear, behind the rocket exhaust, using a diamond cross-section suitable for supersonic lift.

Hercules could carry either a nuclear warhead or a conventional high-explosive warhead (T-45 fragmentation type). Initially the nuclear-armed version carried the W-7 Mod 2E nuclear warhead, with yields of 2.5 or 28 kt. Beginning in FY 1961 the older warheads were replaced by W-31 Mod 0 warheads, with yields of 2 kt (Y1) or 30 kt (Y2). The last versions carried the W31 Mod 2 warhead, with yields of 2 or 20 kt.

Approximately 25,000 Nike Hercules were manufactured. Three versions were produced, MIM-14A, B and C. The differences between these versions are not known. There are slight differences in dimensions as reported in different sources, it is not known if this is due to different versions.

=== Detection and tracking ===
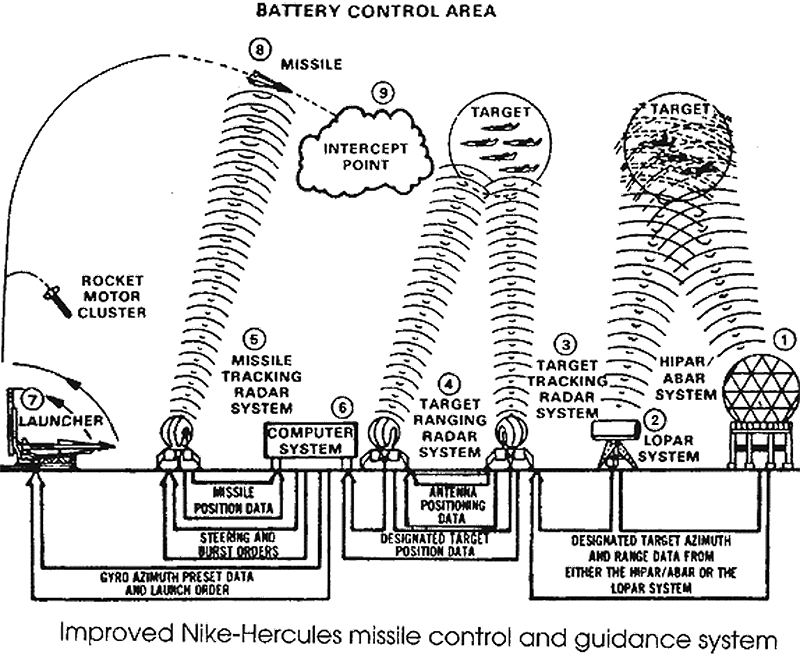
Nike Hercules guidance schematic, surface-to-air mode

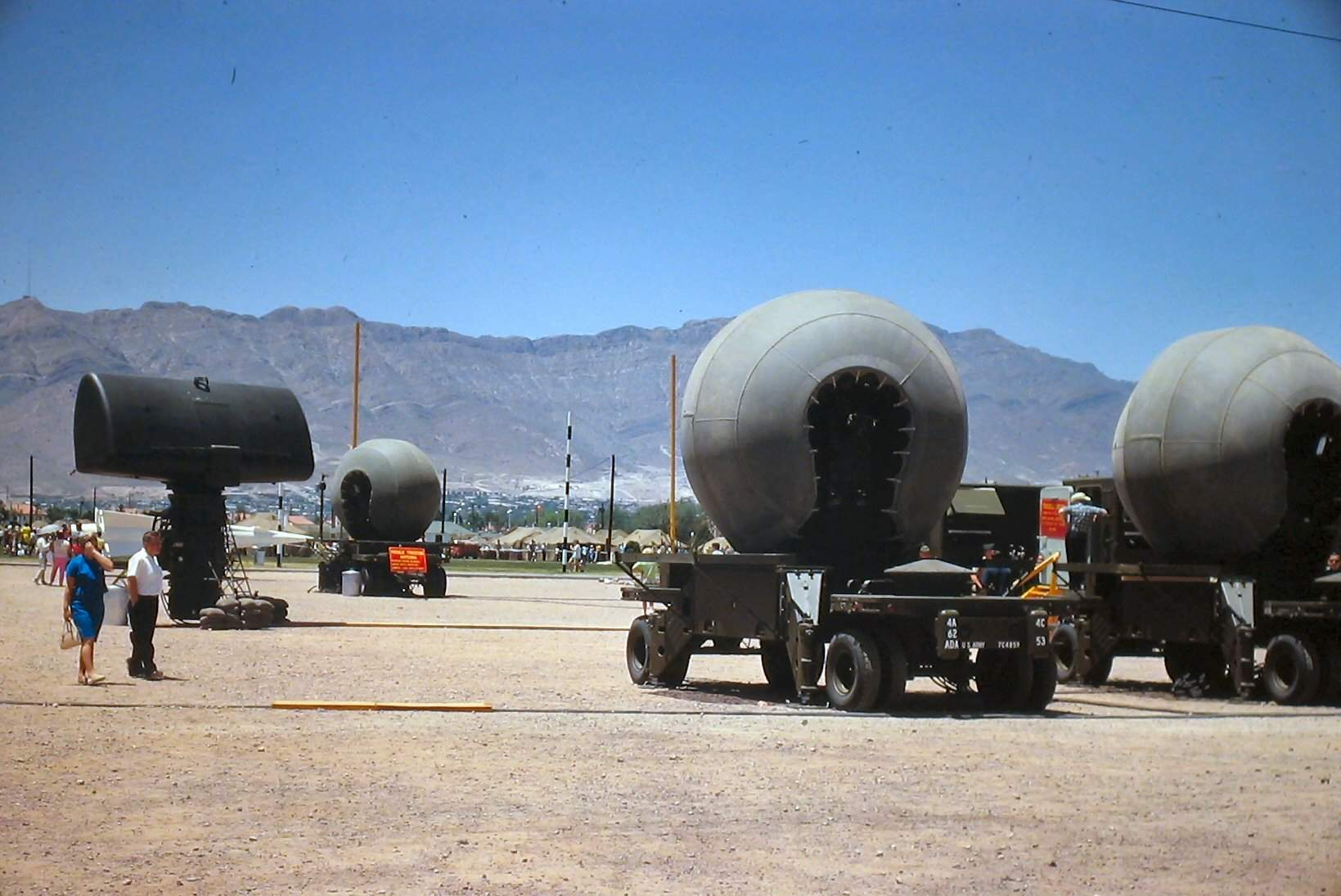
IFC radars. Left: acquisition radar (LOPAR), three spherical antennae: tracking radars. Just behind the right two tracking radars the two vans for housing computer and tracking equipment and the operating consoles for the operators (crew of nine).

Interceptions with the Hercules system would typically start with targets being detected and identified on the HIPAR system, if this was in use. Otherwise the LOPAR was used. In order to simplify the upgrades at Ajax sites, HIPAR did not replace the earlier ACQ radar from Ajax, which was retained and now known as LOPAR. HIPAR used its own displays and operators, and forwarded targeting information to the LOPAR operators who would then pick up those same targets on their own display.

Once a target was found on the LOPAR, it could be identified with aid of an Identification friend or foe system. (Note: According to the Popular Science article of 1954, Ajax did not have an IFF system. It is not clear if this was added later, and if so, if it was part of the HIPAR or LOPAR setups.) The LOPAR provided rough range, azimuth and limited altitude or elevation information to the operators of the Target Tracking Radar (TTR), who would manually slew the TTR onto the target. Once locked-on, tracking was automatic.

New to the Hercules system was the Target Ranging Radar, or TRR. It is relatively easy to jam range information on monopulse radars like the TTR by sending out false return signals. The radar can continue to locate the target in elevation or azimuth because all of the signals come from the same location, but the receiver cannot easily determine which pulse was sent by the radar and which was sent by the electronic countermeasures (ECM) on the target aircraft, which is needed to measure the time-of-flight. The TRR system combatted this by allowing switching between two very different set of frequencies. This signal would be very difficult to jam because the jammer would have to broadcast across a wide set of frequencies in order to ensure they were returning on the frequency the receiver had actually selected. Meanwhile, the TTR can continue offering location information, and in the case that is also jammed (difficult but possible), was upgraded to offer a home-on-jam mode that used the ECM system's own broadcasts as a location source. Skilled operators could also try to track the target in a manual tracking mode.

=== Guidance ===
As soon as the TTR was locked on to a target, an analog computer (later digital) continually computed a suitable intercept point in the sky and an expected 'time to fly' of the missile based on information from the TTR and basic performance information about the missile. This information was displayed on plotting boards.

Prior to launch, the Missile Tracking Radar (MTR) locked on to the transponder in the selected missile. Like the Ajax, the Hercules used a transponder in the missile. A short period after launch the actual location, i.e. azimuth, elevation and range of the missile were displayed on the plotting boards. The firing or launch command was given manually by the Battery Control Officer based on orders or Rules of Engagements. To ensure the MTR could see and track the missile during its initial rapid ascent as it launched, the IFC was normally located about 1 mile (1.6 km) from the "Launching Area" (LA). In the case of Hercules, all of the radars were typically mounted on (concrete) elevated platforms to improve their line-of-sight.

Information from the MTR and TTR continued to be fed to the computer for updating the intercept point based on any actual changes in either the missile or the target location, speed or direction. The guidance commands were sent to the missile by modulating the MTR transmit signal. When the missile neared the intercept point a command signal was sent to the missile to explode.

=== Launch sequence ===
Hercules missiles were normally stored in a "safe" mode, using various keys and pull-to-arm pins. During an alert, the site would go on "blue alert", at which time the LA crew would arm and erect the missiles and then retreat to safety. As the missiles were brought to readiness, a light board in the LA control van lit up with a series of amber lights for each launcher area, and green lights for each missile. On the IFC the status of the selected missile was given.

When the battery was given orders to attack a target, the alert status lamp changed from blue to red. When the TTR and MTR radars were locked, the computer had a firing solution and the missile reported active, the LA lamp changed from amber to green, indicating the ability to fire. At this time the target information and the intercept point were displayed on the plotting boards and the BCO selected the right time to manually fire.

The entire sequence of events from decision to launch to actual launch normally took about 36 seconds. This included about 30 seconds to develop a track for a target; 4 seconds for computer to develop a firing solution, and 2 seconds between the initial fire order command and missile launch. There was a 5-second allowance for the missile to launch, if it failed to do so it was marked "rejected" and another missile selected. A new missile could be launched about 11 seconds after detonation or rejecting the previous missile. Based on the 'time to fly' of the missile this limited overall battery rates to about one launch every couple of minutes.

=== Surface-to-surface mode ===
Hercules also offered the ability to attack pre-located ground targets, after feeding in the coordinates in an operation that took about five minutes. For these missions the computer used the MTR to guide the missile to a point above the target, then commanded it to dive vertically while measuring any changes in trajectory as it fell. The missile would eventually pass out of line-of-sight with the MTR, so final arming information was provided during the dive, and the warhead was triggered by a barometric fuse.

== Accidental launches ==
- Naha AFB, Okinawa June or July 1959, an incident occurred concerning a Hercules anti-aircraft missile on Okinawa which, according to some witnesses, was complete with a nuclear warhead and was accidentally fired from the Nike site 8 battery at Naha Air Base. While the missile was undergoing continuity testing of the firing circuit, known as a squib test, stray voltage caused a short circuit in a faulty cable that was lying in a puddle and allowed the missile's booster to ignite with the launcher still in a horizontal position. The Nike missile left the launcher and smashed through a fence and down into a beach area skipping the warhead out across the water "like a stone." The exhaust blast killed two Army technicians and injured one.
- Inchon, South Korea. Reported in The Washington Post of December 5, 1998, the missile inadvertently launched from a Nike missile site near the summit of Mount Bongnaesan, where it exploded above some reclaimed land off Songdo (now Songdo International Business District), showering residential areas with debris, destroying parked cars and breaking windows.

== Operators ==
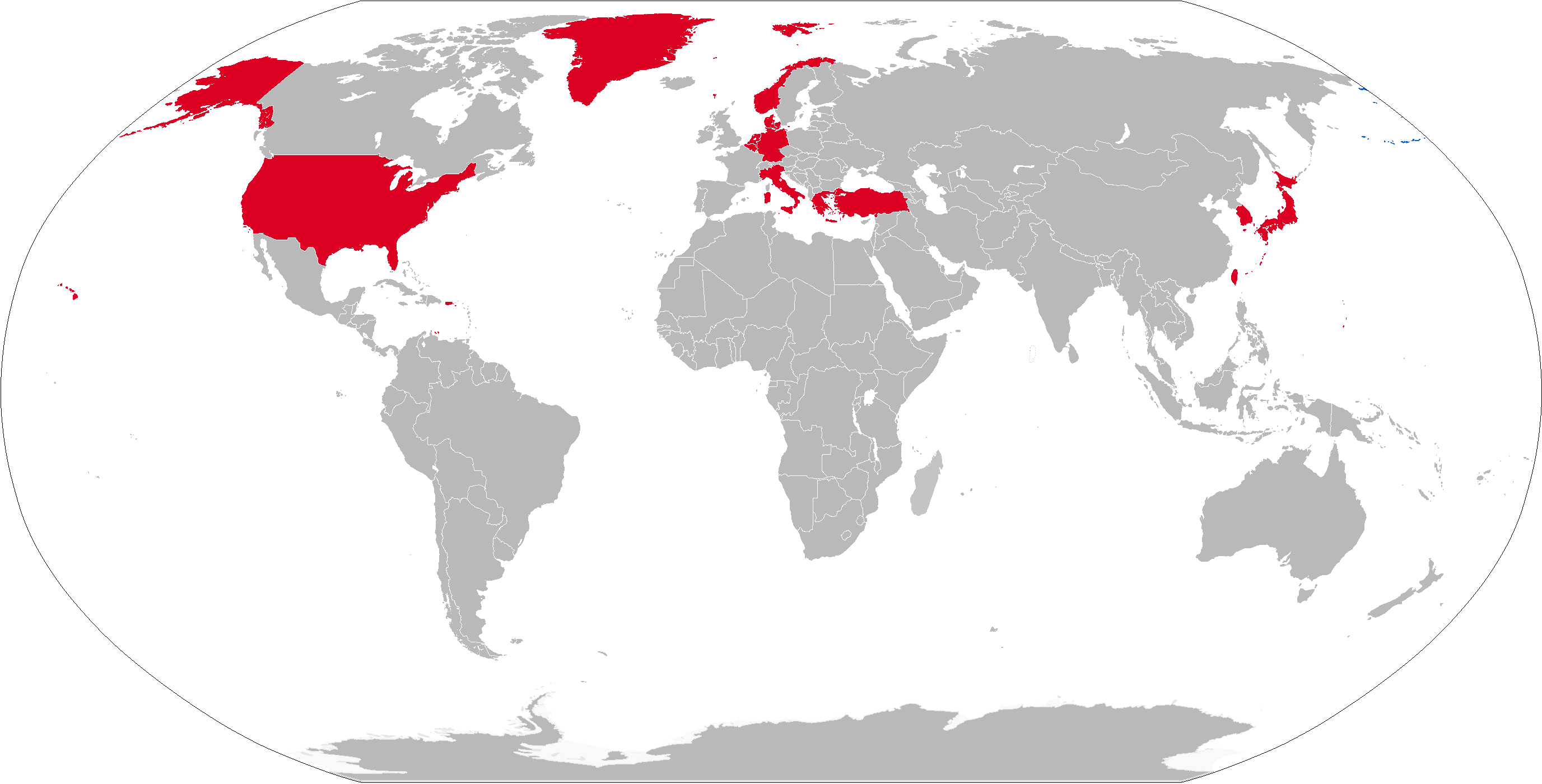
Map with former MIM-14 operators in red

=== Former operators ===
- Belgium
- Denmark
- Germany
- Greece
- Italy
- Japan
- Republic of Korea
- Netherlands
- Norway
- Spain
- Taiwan
- Turkey (in reserve as of 2025)
- United States

== Gallery ==
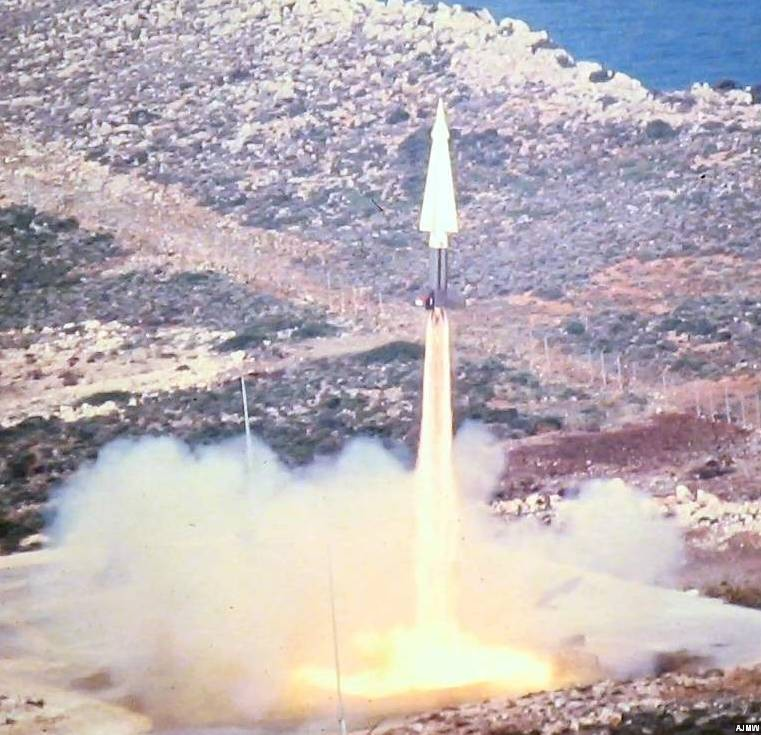
Nike Hercules after take-off at NATO Missile Firing Installation in Greece

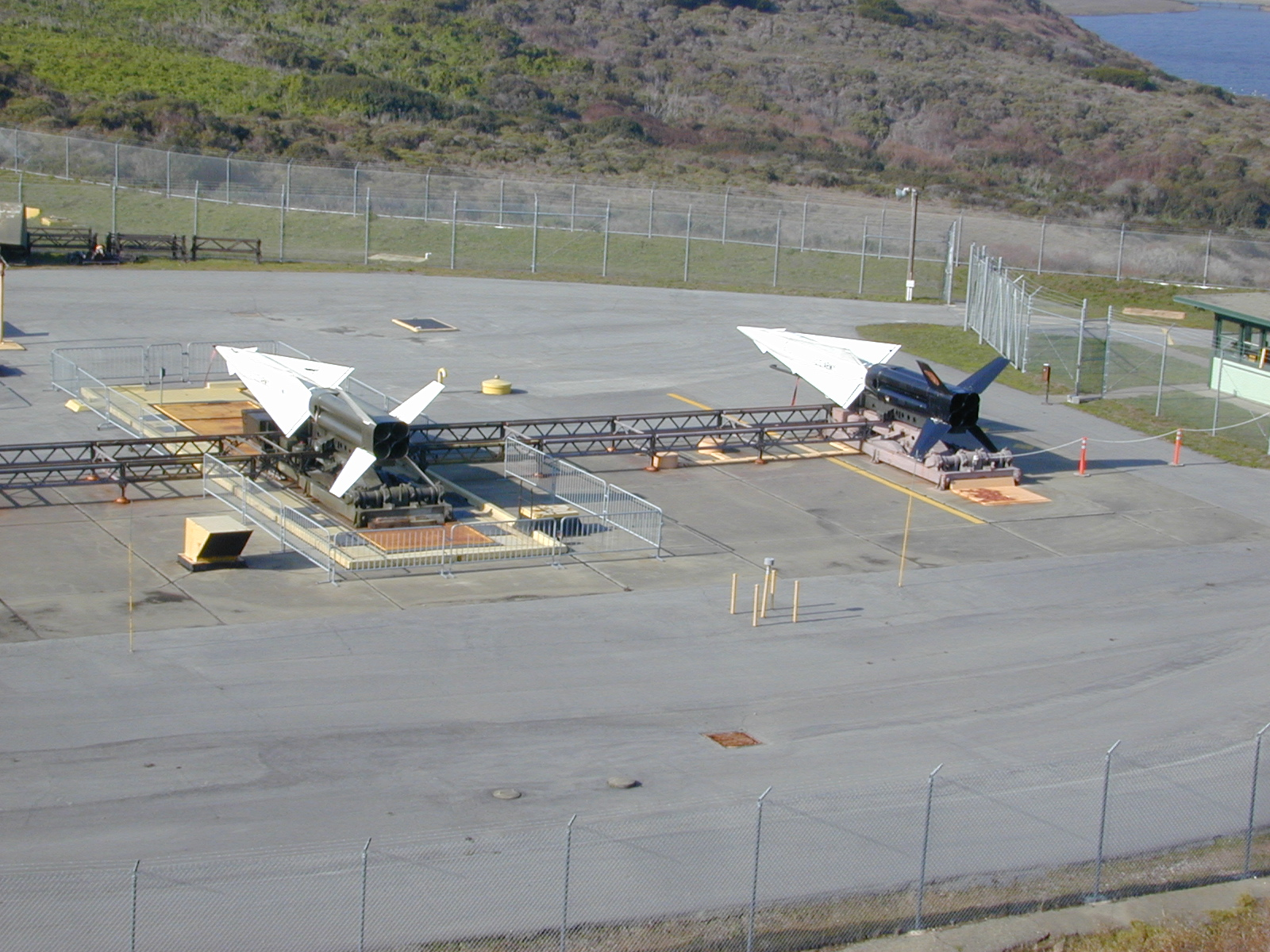
Two Nikes on transport rail

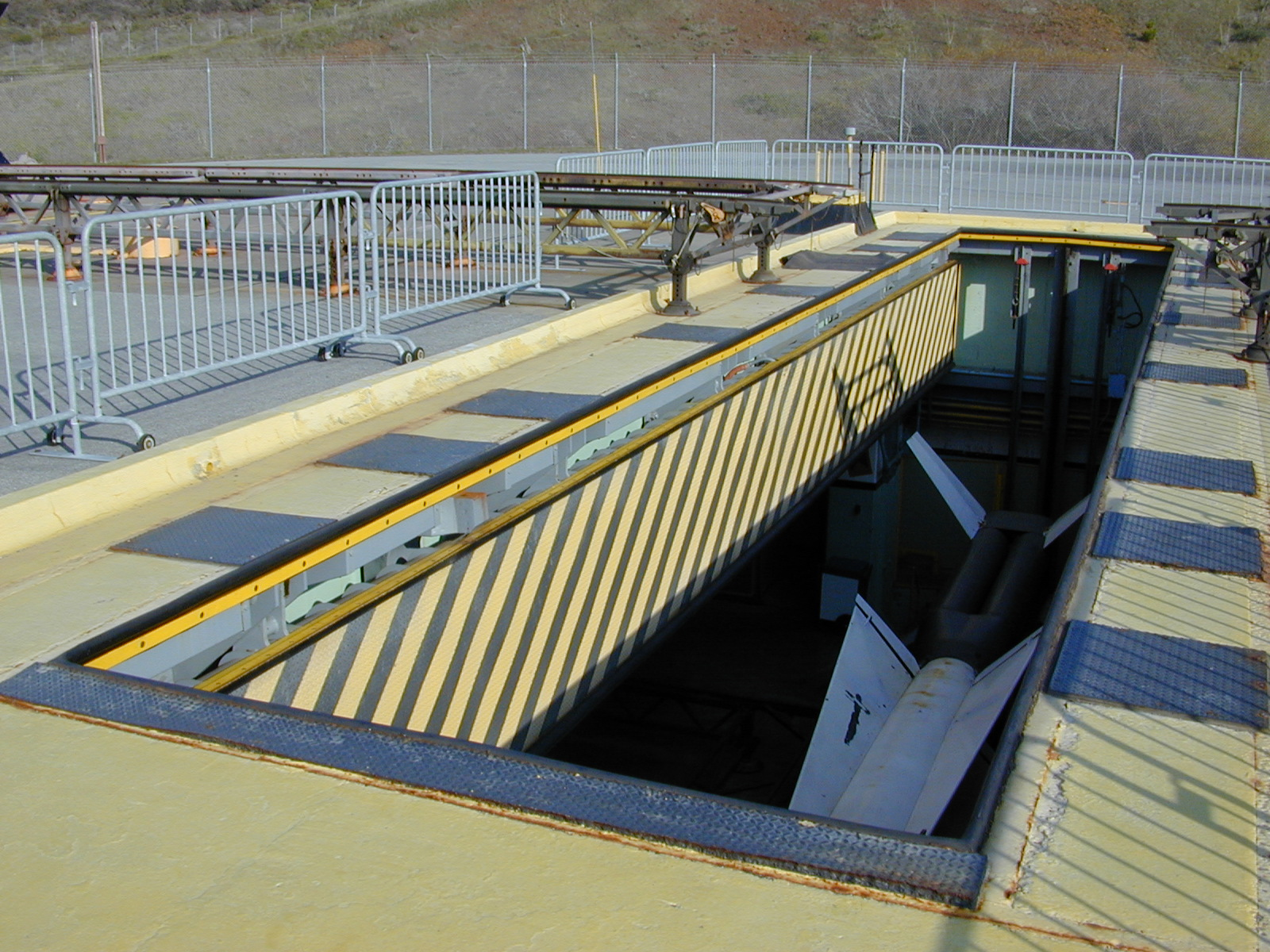
Missile elevator

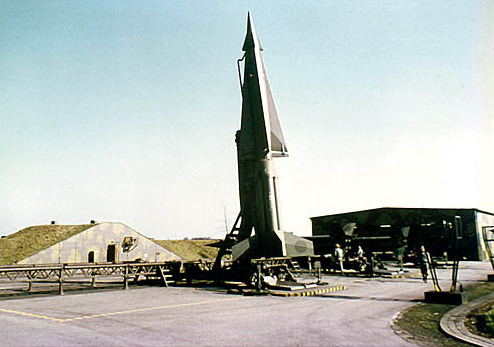
Dutch Nike site in West Germany (note the above ground storage shelter)

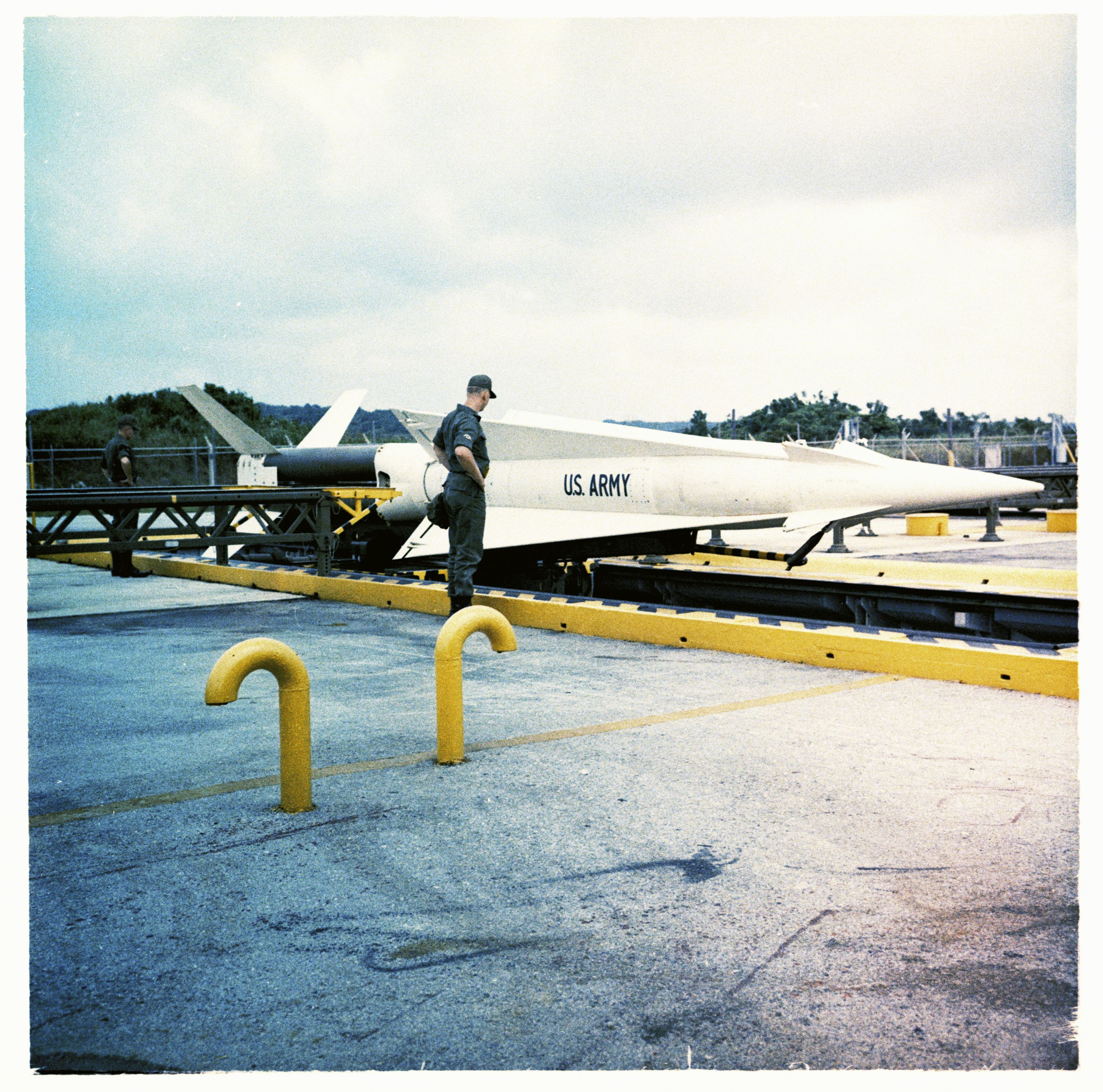
MIM-14 Nike-H missile at Okinawa, June 1967

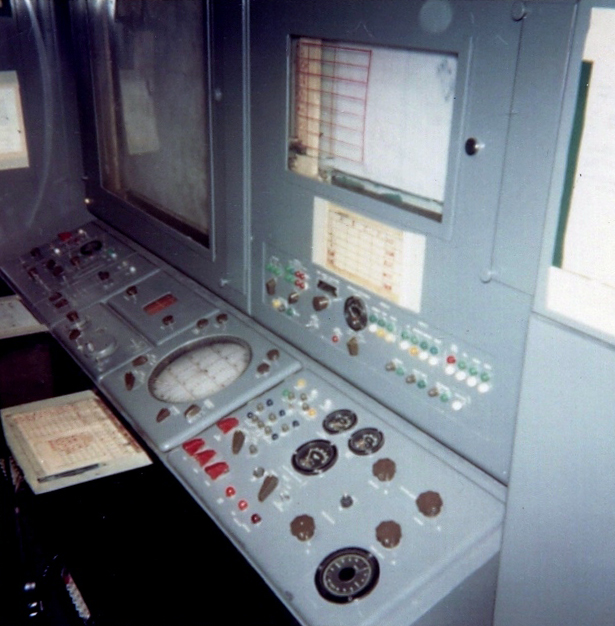
Battery Control Officer operating position with the acquisition radar operator on the left and the computer operator on the right

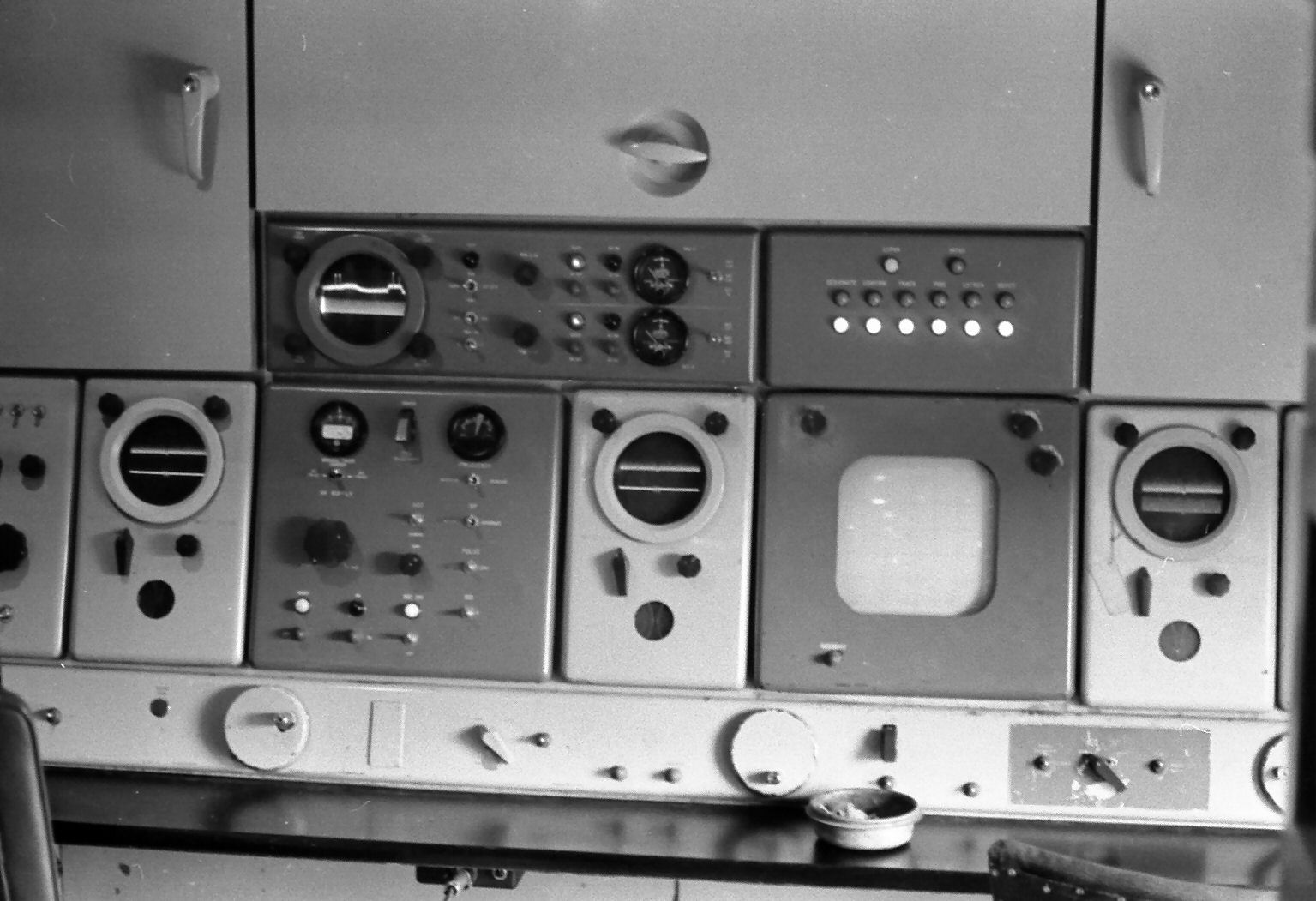
TTR and TRR operator console. The TTR was operated by three operators (range, elevation and azimuth). The TRR was operated by the track supervisor.

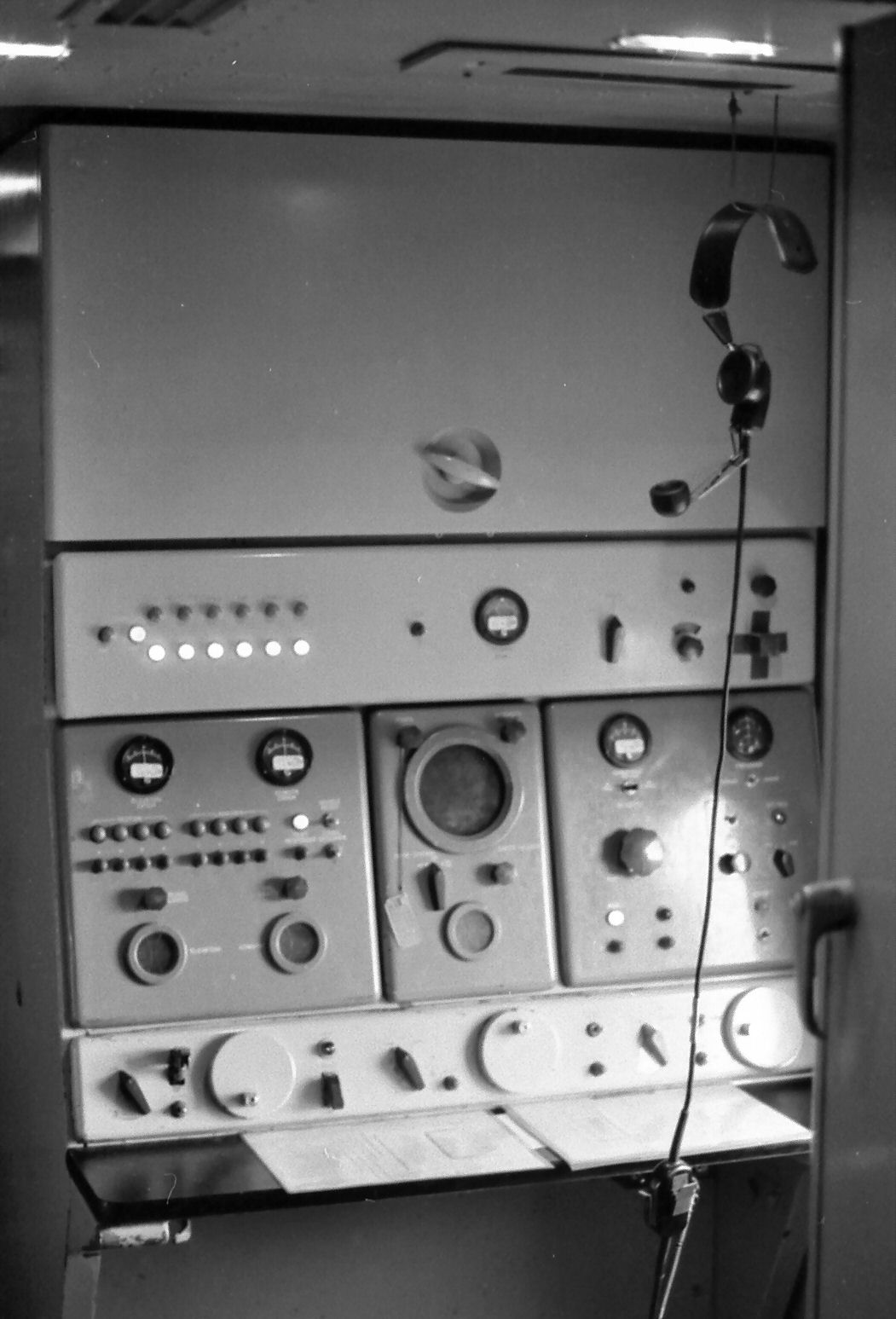
MTR operator console. The MTR was operated by one operator.

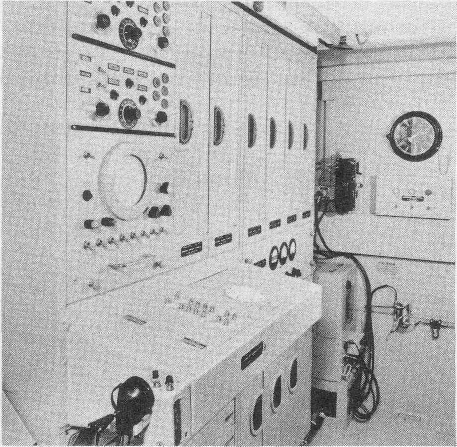
Coder decoder group AN/MSQ-18

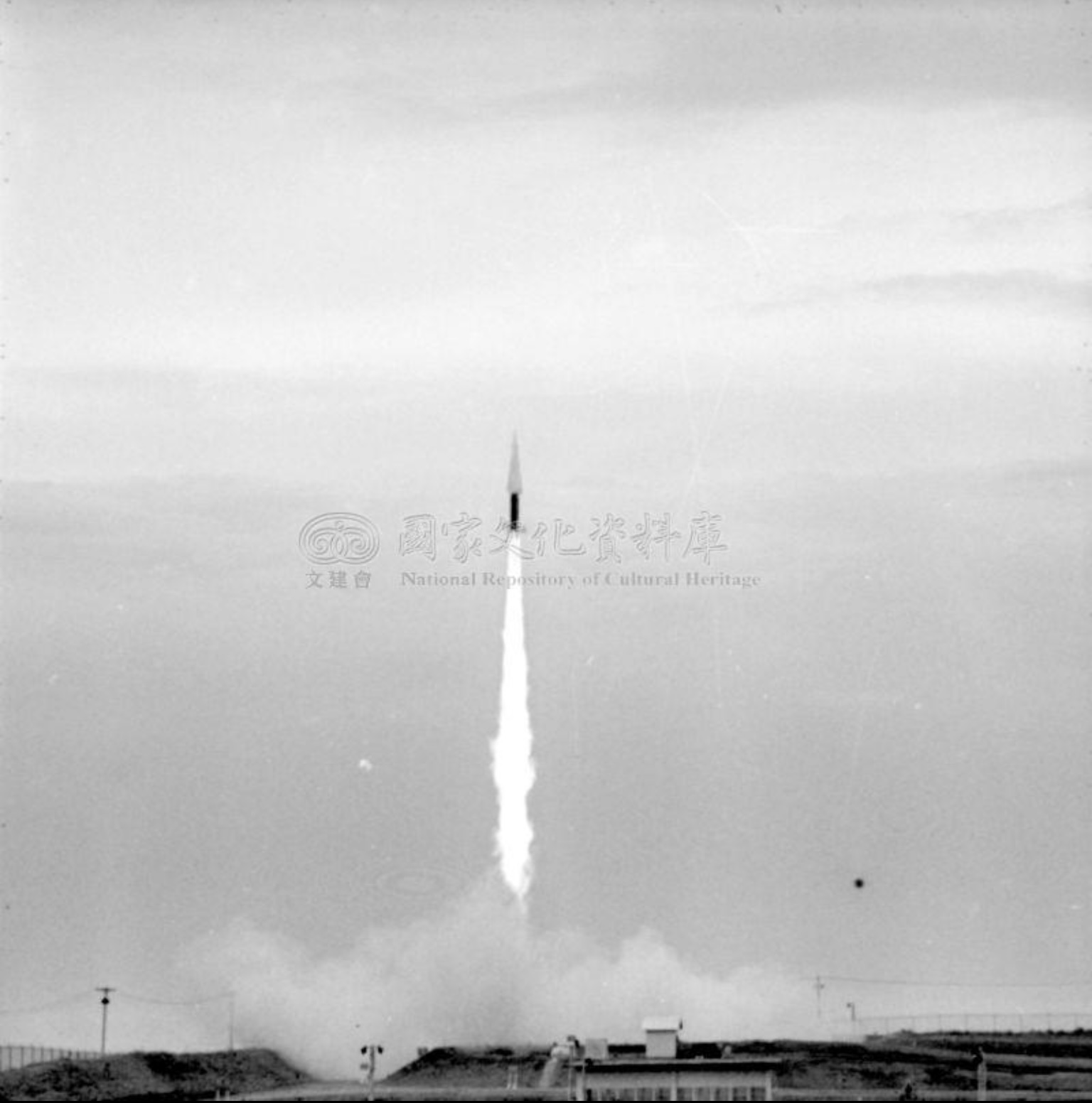
Launch in Taiwan in 1961

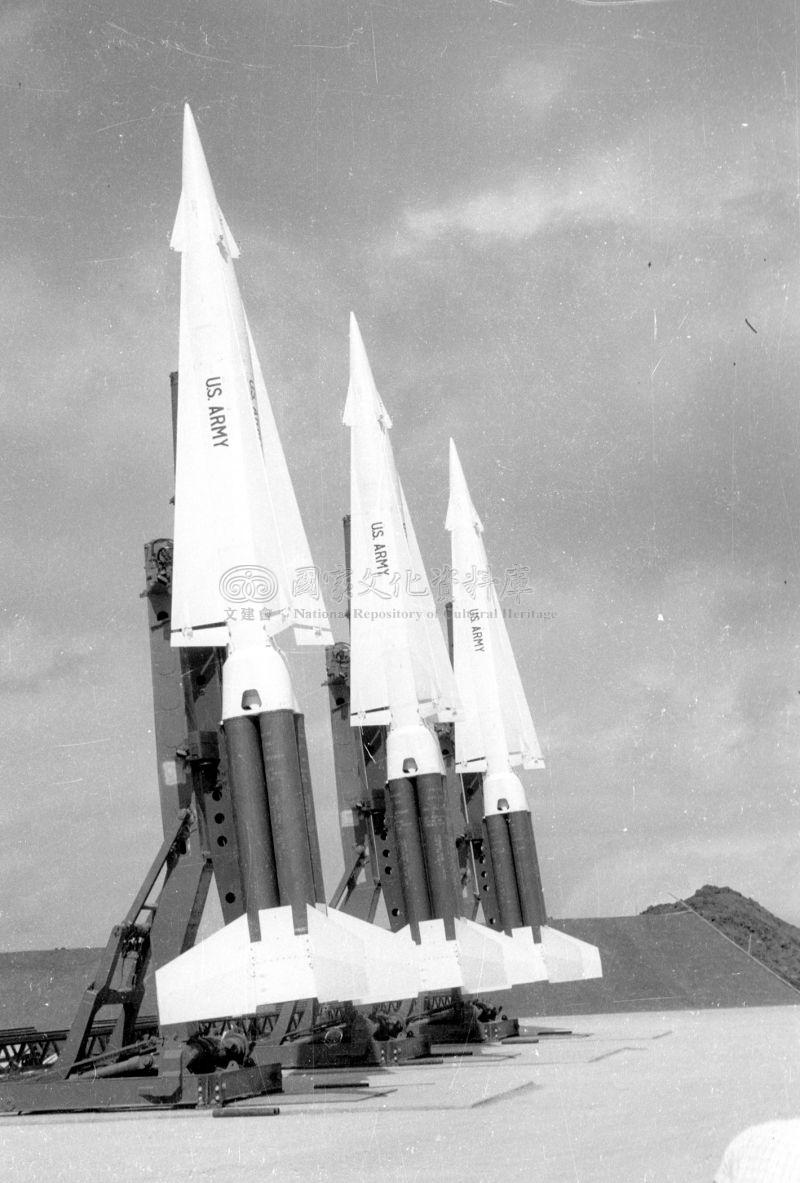
Nike Hercules missiles of the US Army 71st Air Defense Artillery Regiment at Tamsui Missile Base in 1958

== See also ==
- List of missiles
- List of Nike missile locations
- Hyunmoo-1 – (South Korea)
- W31 – (United States)
