= List of things named after Bernhard Riemann =

The German mathematician Bernhard Riemann (1826–1866) is the eponym of many things.

== "Riemann" (by field) ==
- Riemann bilinear relations
- Riemann conditions
- Riemann form
- Riemann function
- Riemann–Hurwitz formula
- Riemann matrix
- Riemann operator
- Riemann singularity theorem
  - Riemann-Kempf singularity theorem
- Riemann surface
  - Compact Riemann surface
  - Planar Riemann surface
- Cauchy–Riemann manifold
  - The tangential Cauchy–Riemann complex
- Zariski–Riemann space

=== Analysis ===
- Cauchy–Riemann equations
- Riemann integral
  - Generalized Riemann integral
  - Riemann multiple integral
- Riemann invariant
- Riemann mapping theorem
  - Measurable Riemann mapping theorem
- Riemann problem
- Riemann solver
- Riemann sphere
- Riemann–Hilbert correspondence
- Riemann–Hilbert problem
- Riemann–Lebesgue lemma
- Riemann–Liouville integral
- Riemann–Roch theorem
  - Arithmetic Riemann–Roch theorem
  - Riemann–Roch theorem for smooth manifolds
  - Riemann–Roch theorem for surfaces
  - Grothendieck–Hirzebruch–Riemann–Roch theorem
  - Hirzebruch–Riemann–Roch theorem
- Riemann–Stieltjes integral
- Riemann series theorem
- Riemann sum

=== Number theory ===
- Riemann–von Mangoldt formula
- Riemann hypothesis
  - Generalized Riemann hypothesis
  - Grand Riemann hypothesis
  - Riemann hypothesis for curves over finite fields
- Riemann theta function
- Riemann Xi function
- Riemann zeta function
- Riemann–Siegel formula
- Riemann–Siegel theta function

=== Physics ===
- Free Riemann gas also called primon gas
- Riemann invariant
- Riemann–Cartan geometry
- Riemann–Silberstein vector
- Riemann-Lebovitz formulation
- Riemann curvature tensor also called Riemann tensor
- Riemann tensor (general relativity)

== Riemannian ==
- Pseudo-Riemannian manifold
- Riemannian bundle metric
- Riemannian circle
- Riemannian cobordism
- Riemannian connection
- Riemannian connection on a surface
- Riemannian cubic
- Riemannian cubic polynomials
- Riemannian foliation
- Riemannian geometry
  - Fundamental theorem of Riemannian geometry
- Riemannian graph
- Riemannian group
- Riemannian holonomy
- Riemannian manifold also called Riemannian space
- Riemannian metric tensor
- Riemannian Penrose inequality
- Riemannian polyhedron
- Riemannian singular value decomposition
- Riemannian submanifold
- Riemannian submersion
- Riemannian volume form
- Riemannian wavefield extrapolation
- Sub-Riemannian manifold
- Riemannian symmetric space

== Riemann's ==
- Riemann's differential equation
- Riemann's existence theorem
- Riemann's explicit formula
- Riemann's minimal surface
- Riemann's theorem on removable singularities

== Non-mathematical ==
- Free Riemann gas
- Riemann (crater)
- 4167 Riemann
