= Riemannian connection on a surface =

Intrinsic geometric structures in mathematics

In mathematics, the Riemannian connection on a surface or Riemannian 2-manifold refers to several intrinsic geometric structures discovered by Tullio Levi-Civita, Élie Cartan and Hermann Weyl in the early part of the twentieth century: parallel transport, covariant derivative and connection form. These concepts were put in their current form with principal bundles only in the 1950s. The classical nineteenth century approach to the differential geometry of surfaces, due in large part to Carl Friedrich Gauss, has been reworked in this modern framework, which provides the natural setting for the classical theory of the moving frame as well as the Riemannian geometry of higher-dimensional Riemannian manifolds. This account is intended as an introduction to the theory of connections.

== Historical overview ==
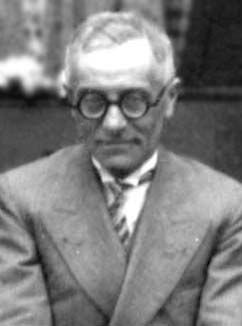
Tullio Levi-Civita (1873–1941)

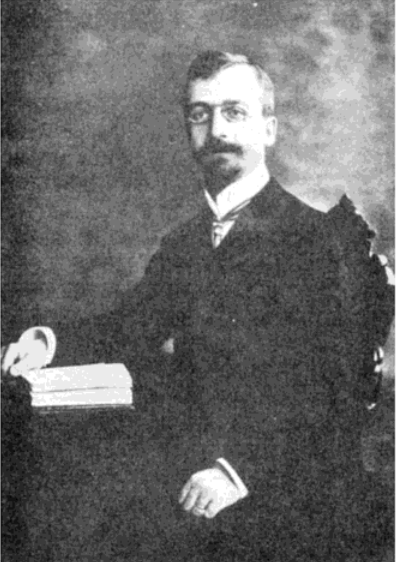
Élie Cartan (1869–1951)

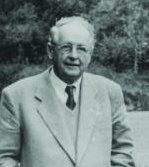
Hermann Weyl (1885–1955)

After the classical work of Gauss on the differential geometry of surfaces and the subsequent emergence of the concept of Riemannian manifold initiated by Bernhard Riemann in the mid-nineteenth century, the geometric notion of connection developed by Tullio Levi-Civita, Élie Cartan and Hermann Weyl in the early twentieth century represented a major advance in differential geometry. The introduction of parallel transport, covariant derivatives and connection forms gave a more conceptual and uniform way of understanding curvature, allowing generalisations to higher-dimensional manifolds; this is now the standard approach in graduate-level textbooks. It also provided an important tool for defining new topological invariants called characteristic classes via the Chern–Weil homomorphism.

Although Gauss was the first to study the differential geometry of surfaces in Euclidean space E^{3}, it was not until Riemann's Habilitationsschrift of 1854 that the notion of a Riemannian space was introduced. Christoffel introduced his eponymous symbols in 1869. Tensor calculus was developed by Ricci, who published a systematic treatment with Levi-Civita in 1901. Covariant differentiation of tensors was given a geometric interpretation by Levi-Civita (1917) who introduced the notion of parallel transport on surfaces. His discovery prompted Weyl and Cartan to introduce various notions of connection, including in particular that of affine connection. Cartan's approach was rephrased in the modern language of principal bundles by Ehresmann, after which the subject rapidly took its current form following contributions by Chern, Ambrose and Singer, Kobayashi, Nomizu, Lichnerowicz and others.

Connections on a surface can be defined in a variety of ways. The Riemannian connection or Levi-Civita connection is perhaps most easily understood in terms of lifting vector fields, considered as first order differential operators acting on functions on the manifold, to differential operators on sections of the frame bundle. In the case of an embedded surface, this lift is very simply described in terms of orthogonal projection. Indeed, the vector bundles associated with the frame bundle are all sub-bundles of trivial bundles that extend to the ambient Euclidean space; a first order differential operator can always be applied to a section of a trivial bundle, in particular to a section of the original sub-bundle, although the resulting section might no longer be a section of the sub-bundle. This can be corrected by projecting orthogonally.

The Riemannian connection can also be characterized abstractly, independently of an embedding. The equations of geodesics are easy to write in terms of the Riemannian connection, which can be locally expressed in terms of the Christoffel symbols. Along a curve in the surface, the connection defines a first order differential equation in the frame bundle. The monodromy of this equation defines parallel transport for the connection, a notion introduced in this context by Levi-Civita. This gives an equivalent, more geometric way of describing the connection as lifting paths in the manifold to paths in the frame bundle. This formalises the classical theory of the "moving frame", favoured by French authors. Lifts of loops about a point give rise to the holonomy group at that point. The Gaussian curvature at a point can be recovered from parallel transport around increasingly small loops at the point. Equivalently curvature can be calculated directly infinitesimally in terms of Lie brackets of lifted vector fields.

The approach of Cartan, using connection 1-forms on the frame bundle of M, gives a third way to understand the Riemannian connection, which is particularly easy to describe for an embedded surface. Thanks to a result of Kobayashi (1956), later generalized by Narasimhan & Ramanan (1961), the Riemannian connection on a surface embedded in Euclidean space E^{3} is just the pullback under the Gauss map of the Riemannian connection on S^{2}. Using the identification of S^{2} with the homogeneous space SO(3)/SO(2), the connection 1-form is just a component of the Maurer–Cartan 1-form on SO(3). In other words, everything reduces to understanding the 2-sphere properly.

== Covariant derivative ==
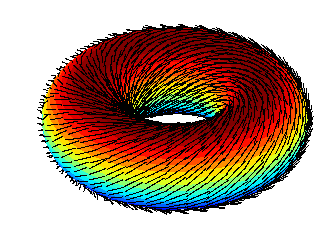
A vector field on the torus

For a surface M embedded in E^{3} (or more generally a higher-dimensional Euclidean space), there are several equivalent definitions of a vector field X on M:

- a smooth map of M into E^{3} taking values in the tangent space at each point;
- the velocity vector of a local flow on M;
- a first order differential operator without constant term in any local chart on M;
- a derivation of C^{∞}(M).

The last condition means that the assignment f ↦ Xf on C^{∞}(M) satisfies the Leibniz rule

$$X(fg)= (Xf)g + f(Xg).$$

The space of all vector fields $\mathcal{X}$(M) forms a module over C^{∞}(M), closed under the Lie bracket

$$[X,Y]f= X(Yf) - Y(Xf)$$

with a C^{∞}(M)-valued inner product (X,Y), which encodes the Riemannian metric on M.

Since $\mathcal{X}$(M) is a submodule of C^{∞}(M, E^{3})=C^{∞}(M)$\otimes$ E^{3}, the operator X$\otimes$ I is defined on $\mathcal{X}$(M), taking values in C^{∞}(M, E^{3}).

Let P be the smooth map from M into M_{3}(R) such that P(p) is the orthogonal projection of E^{3} onto the tangent space at p. Thus for the unit normal vector n_{p} at p, uniquely defined up to a sign, and v in E^{3}, the projection is given by P(p)(v) = v - (v · n_{p}) n_{p}.

Pointwise multiplication by P gives a C^{∞}(M)-module map of C^{∞}(M, E^{3}) onto $\mathcal{X}$(M) . The assignment

$\nabla_X Y = P((X\otimes I)Y)$

defines an operator $\nabla_X$ on $\mathcal{X}$(M) called the covariant derivative, satisfying the following properties

1. $\nabla_X$ is C^{∞}(M)-linear in X
2. $\nabla_X(fY) = (Xf) Y + f \nabla_X Y$ (Leibniz rule for derivation of a module)
3. $X(Y,Z)=(\nabla_X Y,Z) + (Y,\nabla_X Z)$ (compatibility with the metric)
4. $\nabla_X Y - \nabla_Y X = [X,Y]$ (symmetry property).

The first three properties state that $\nabla$ is an affine connection compatible with the metric, sometimes also called a hermitian or metric connection. The last symmetry property says that the torsion tensor

$$T(X,Y)=  \nabla_X Y - \nabla_Y X - [X,Y]$$

vanishes identically, so that the affine connection is torsion-free.

The assignment $\nabla$ is uniquely determined by these four conditions and is called the Riemannian connection or Levi-Civita connection.

Although the Riemannian connection was defined using an embedding in Euclidean space, this uniqueness property means that it is in fact an intrinsic invariant of the surface.

Its existence can be proved directly for a general surface by noting that the four properties imply the Koszul formula

$$2(\nabla_X Y,Z)= X\cdot(Y,Z)+Y\cdot(X,Z) - Z\cdot(X,Y) +([X,Y],Z) +([Z,X],Y) + (X,[Z,Y]),$$

so that $\nabla_X Y$ depends only on the metric and is unique. On the other hand, if this is used as a definition of $\nabla_X Y$, it is readily checked that the four properties above are satisfied.

For u an isometric embedding of M in E^{3}, the tangent vectors $u_1=\partial_x$ and $u_2=\partial_y u$ yield a $2 \times 2$ matrix $g_{ij} = u_i\cdot u_j$ It is a positive-definite matrix. Its inverse is also positive-definite symmetric, with matrix $g^{ij}$. The inverse also has a unique positive-definite square root, with matrix $h_{ij}$. It is routine to check that $e_i = \sum_{j} h_{ij} u_j$ form an orthonormal basis of the tangent space. In this case, the projection onto the tangent space is given by $P(p)(v) =\sum (v,e_i)e_i$ so that

$$\nabla_{\partial_i}\partial_j u = P(p)(\partial_i\partial_i u) = \sum_k (\partial_i\partial_j u,e_k) e_k =
\sum_{k,\ell,m} (\partial_i\partial_j u)\cdot  (\partial_\ell u) h_{k\ell}h_{km} \partial_m u= \sum_{\ell,m} (\partial_i\partial_j u)\cdot  (\partial_\ell u) g^{\ell m} \partial_m u.$$

Thus $\nabla_{\partial_i}\partial_j =\sum_k \Gamma_{ij}^k \partial_k$, where

$$\Gamma_{ij}^k = {1\over 2} \sum_\ell g^{k\ell} \left(\partial_i(\partial_j u \cdot \partial_\ell u) + \partial_j(\partial_i u\cdot \partial_\ell u) - \partial_\ell(\partial_i u \cdot \partial_j u)\right.$$

Since $g_{ij} =u_i \cdot u_j$, this gives another way to derive the Christoffel symbols:

$$\Gamma_{ij}^k = {1\over 2} \sum_\ell g^{k\ell} (\partial_i g_{j\ell} +\partial_j g_{i\ell} -\partial_\ell g_{ij}).$$

Formulas for covariant derivative can be also be derived from local coordinates (x,y) without the use of isometric embeddings. Taking $\partial_x$ and '$\partial_y$ as vector fields, the connection $\nabla$ can be expressed purely in terms of the metric using the Christoffel symbols:

$$\nabla_{\partial_i} \partial_j =  \sum_k \Gamma^k_{ij} \partial_k.$$

To derive the formula, the Koszul formula can be applied with X, Y and Z set to $\partial_i$'s; in that case all the Lie brackets commute.

== Curvature operator ==
The Riemann curvature tensor can be defined by covariant derivatives using the curvature operator:

$$R(X,Y)=\nabla_X \nabla_Y - \nabla_Y\nabla_X - \nabla_{[X,Y]}.$$

Since the assignment $(X,Y,Z) \mapsto R(X,Y)Z$ is C^{∞}(M)-linear in each variable, it follows that R(x,Y)_{p} is an endomorphism at p. For X and Y linearly independent tangent vectors at p,

$$K={(R(X,Y)Y,X)\over (X,X)(Y,Y)-(X,Y)^2}$$

is independent of the choice of basis and is called the Gaussian curvature at p. The Riemann curvature tensor is given by

$$R(X,Y,Z,W)=(R(X,Y)Z,W).$$

To check independence of K it suffices to note that it does not change under elementary transformations sending (X,Y) to (Y,X), (λX,Y) and (X + Y,Y). That in turn relies on the fact that the operator R(X,Y) is skew-adjoint. Skew-adjointness entails that (R(X,Y)Z,Z) = 0 for all Z, which follows because

$$(R(X,Y)Z,Z) = X(\nabla_Y Z, Z) -Y(\nabla_X Z,Z) - (\nabla_{[X,Y]}Z,Z) ={1\over 2}(XY(Z,Z) -YX(Z,Z) -[X,Y](Z,Z))=0.$$

== Parallel transport ==
Parallel transport of a vector around a geodesic triangle on the sphere. The length of the transported vector and the angle it makes with each side remain constant.

Given a curve in the Euclidean plane and a vector at the starting point, the vector can be transported along the curve by requiring the moving vector to remain parallel to the original one and of the same length, i.e. it should remain constant along the curve. If the curve is closed, the vector will be unchanged when the starting point is reached again. This is well known not to be possible on a general surface, the sphere being the most familiar case. In fact it is not usually possible to identify simultaneously or "parallelize" all the tangent planes of such a surface: the only parallelizable closed surfaces are those homeomorphic to a torus.

Parallel transport can always be defined along curves on a surface using only the metric on the surface. Thus tangent planes along a curve can be identified using the intrinsic geometry, even when the surface itself is not parallelizable.

The Euler equations for a geodesic c(f) can be written more compactly as

$$\nabla_{\dot{c}} \dot{c} = 0.$$

Parallel transport along geodesics, the "straight lines" of the surface, is easy to define. A vector in the tangent plane is transported along a geodesic as the unique vector field with constant length and making a constant angle with the velocity vector of the geodesic.

For a general curve, its geodesic curvature measures how far the curve departs from being a geodesics; it is defined as the rate at which the curve's velocity vector rotates in the surface. In turn the geodesic curvature determines how vectors in the tangent planes along the curve should rotate during parallel transport.

A vector field v(t) along a unit speed curve c(t), with geodesic curvature k_{g}(t), is said to be parallel along the curve if

- it has constant length
- the angle θ(t) that it makes with the velocity vector $\dot{c}(t)$ satisfies

$\dot{\theta}(t) = - k_g(t)$

This yields the previous rule for parallel transport along a geodesic, because in that case k_{g} = 0, so the angle θ(t) should remain constant. The existence of parallel transport follows from standard existence theorems for ordinary differential equations. The above differential equation can be rewritten in terms of the covariant derivative as

$\nabla_{\dot{c}} v = 0$

This equation shows once more that parallel transport depends only on the metric structure so is an intrinsic invariant of the surface. Parallel transport can be extended immediately to piecewise C^{1} curves.

When M is a surface embedded in E^{3}, this last condition can be written in terms of the projection-valued function P as

$P(c(t)) \dot{v}(t)=0$

or in other words:

The velocity vector of v must be normal to the surface.

Arnold has suggested that since parallel transport on a geodesic segment is easy to describe, parallel transport on an arbitrary C^{1} curve could be constructed as a limit of parallel transport on an approximating family of piecewise geodesic curves.

This equation shows once more that parallel transport depends only on the metric structure so is an intrinsic invariant of the surface; it is another way of writing the ordinary differential equation involving the geodesic curvature of c. Parallel transport can be extended immediately to piecewise C^{1} curves.

The covariant derivative can in turn be recovered from parallel transport. In fact $\nabla_X Y$ can be calculated at a point p, by taking a curve c through p with tangent X, using parallel transport to view the restriction of Y to c as a function in the tangent space at p and then taking the derivative.

== Orthonormal frame bundle ==
Let M be a surface embedded in E^{3}. The orientation on the surface means that an "outward pointing" normal unit vector n is defined at each point of the surface and hence a determinant can be defined on tangent vectors v and w at that point:

$$\mathrm{det}({\mathbf v}, {\mathbf w}) = ({\mathbf v} \times {\mathbf w})\cdot {\mathbf n},$$

using the usual scalar triple product on E^{3} (itself a determinant).

An ordered basis or frame v, w in the tangent space is said to be oriented if det(v, w) is positive.

- The tangent bundle of M consists of pairs (p, v) in M x E^{3} such that v lies in the tangent plane to M at p.
- The frame bundle F of M consists of triples (p, e_{1}, e_{2}) with an e_{1}, e_{2} an oriented orthonormal basis of the tangent plane at p.
- The circle bundle of M consists of pairs (p, v) with ||v|| = 1. It is identical to the frame bundle because, for each unit tangent vector v, there is a unique tangent vector w with det(v, w) = 1.

Since the group of rotations in the plane SO(2) acts simply transitively on oriented orthonormal frames in the plane, it follows that it also acts on the frame or circle bundles of M. The definitions of the tangent bundle, the unit tangent bundle and the (oriented orthonormal) frame bundle F can be extended to arbitrary surfaces in the usual way. There is a similar identification between the latter two which again become principal SO(2)-bundles. In other words:

The frame bundle is a principal bundle with structure group SO(2).

There is also a corresponding notion of parallel transport in the setting of frame bundles:

Every continuously differentiable curve in M can be lifted to a curve in F in such a way that the tangent vector field of the lifted curve is the lift of the tangent vector field of the original curve.

This statement means that any frame on a curve can be parallelly transported along the curve. This is precisely the idea of "moving frames". Since any unit tangent vector can be completed uniquely to an oriented frame, parallel transport of tangent vectors implies (and is equivalent to) parallel transport of frames. The lift of a geodesic in M turns out to be a geodesic in F for the Sasaki metric (see below). Moreover, the Gauss map of M into S^{2} induces a natural map between the associated frame bundles which is equivariant for the actions of SO(2).

Cartan's idea of introducing the frame bundle as a central object was the natural culmination of the theory of moving frames, developed in France by Darboux and Goursat. It also echoed parallel developments in Albert Einstein's theory of relativity. Objects appearing in the formulas of Gauss, such as the Christoffel symbols, can be given a natural geometric interpretation in this framework. Unlike the more intuitive normal bundle, easily visualised as a tubular neighbourhood of an embedded surface in E^{3}, the frame bundle is an intrinsic invariant that can be defined independently of an embedding. When there is an embedding, it can also be visualised as a subbundle of the Euclidean frame bundle E^{3} x SO(3), itself a submanifold of E^{3} x M_{3}(R).

== Principal connection ==
The theory of connections according to Élie Cartan, and later Charles Ehresmann, revolves around:

- a principal bundle F (in this case the orthonormal frame bundle);
- the exterior differential calculus of differential forms on F.

All "natural" vector bundles associated with the manifold M, such as the tangent bundle, the cotangent bundle or the exterior bundles, can be constructed from the frame bundle using the representation theory of the structure group K = SO(2), a compact matrix group.

Cartan's definition of a connection can be understood as a way of lifting vector fields on M to vector fields on the frame bundle F invariant under the action of the structure group K. Since parallel transport has been defined as a way of lifting piecewise C^{1} paths from M to F, this automatically induces infinitesimally a way to lift vector fields or tangent vectors from M to F. At a point take a path with given tangent vector and then map it to the tangent vector of the lifted path. (For vector fields the curves can be taken to be the integral curves of a local flow.) In this way any vector field X on M can be lifted to a vector field X* on F satisfying

- X* is a vector field on F;
- the map X ↦ X* is C^{∞}(M)-linear;
- X* is K-invariant and induces the vector field X on C^{∞}(M) $\subset$ C^{∞}(F).

Here K acts as a periodic flow on F, so the canonical generator A of its Lie algebra acts as the corresponding vector field, called the vertical vector field A*. It follows from the above conditions that, in the tangent space of an arbitrary point in F, the lifts X* span a two-dimensional subspace of horizontal vectors, forming a complementary subspace to the vertical vectors. The canonical Riemannian metric on F of Shigeo Sasaki is defined by making the horizontal and vertical subspaces orthogonal, giving each subspace its natural inner product.

Horizontal vector fields admit the following characterisation:

- Every K-invariant horizontal vector field on F has the form X* for a unique vector field X on M.

This "universal lift" then immediately induces lifts to vector bundles associated with F and hence allows the covariant derivative, and its generalisation to forms, to be recovered.

If σ is a representation of K on a finite-dimensional vector space V, then the associated vector bundle F x_{K} V over M has a C^{∞}(M)-module of sections that can be identified with

$$C^\infty(E,V)^K,$$

the space of all smooth functions ξ : F → V which are K-equivariant in the sense that

$$\xi(x\cdot g) = \sigma(g^{-1})\xi(x)$$

for all x ∈ F and g ∈ K.

The identity representation of SO(2) on R^{2} corresponds to the tangent bundle of M.

The covariant derivative $\nabla_X$ is defined on an invariant section ξ by the formula

$\nabla_X \xi= (X^*\otimes I)\xi.$

The connection on the frame bundle can also be described using K-invariant differential 1-forms on F.

The orthonormal frame bundle F is a 3-manifold. One of the key facts about F is that it is (absolutely or completely) parallelizable, i.e. for
n = dim F, there are n vector fields on F which form a basis at each point. As a result its Lie algebra is easy to understand; and the dual 1-forms on F have a particularly simple structure described by the Cartan structural equations discussed below. In general it is known from Milnor & Stasheff (1974) that any orientable compact 3-manifold is parallelizable, although the proof is not elementary. For frame bundles, however, it is a straightforward consequence of the formalism of transition matrices between local trivializing charts.

The space of p-forms on F is denoted Λ^{p}(F). It admits a natural action of the structure group K.

Given a connection on the principal bundle F corresponding to a lift X ↦ X* of vector fields on M, there is a unique connection form ω in

$$\Lambda^1(F)^K$$,

the space of K-invariant 1-forms on F, such that

$$\omega(X^*)= 0$$

for all vector fields X on M and

$$\omega(A^*)= 1,$$

for the vector field A* on F corresponding to the canonical generator A of $\mathfrak k$.

Conversely the lift X* is uniquely characterised by the following properties:

- X* is K-invariant and induces X on M;
- ω(X*)=0.

== Cartan structural equations ==
On the orthonormal frame bundle F of a surface M there are three canonical 1-forms:

- The connection form ω, invariant under the structure group K = SO(2)
- Two tautologous 1-forms θ_{1} and θ_{2}, transforming according to the basis vectors of the identity representation of K

If π: F $\rightarrow$ M is the natural projection, the 1-forms θ_{1} and θ_{2} are defined by

$$\theta_i(Y) = (d\pi(Y), e_i)$$

where Y is a vector field on F and e_{1}, e_{2} are the tangent vectors to M of the orthonormal frame.

These 1-forms satisfy the following structural equations, due in this formulation to Cartan:

$d\theta_1 = \omega\wedge\theta_2 + h_1 \,\theta_1\wedge \theta_2, \,\, d\theta_2= - \omega\wedge \theta_1 + h_2 \,\theta_1 \wedge \theta_2$

(First structural equations)

$d\omega= -(K\circ \pi)\theta_1\wedge\theta_2$

(Second structural equation)

where h_{1} and h_{2} are smooth functions on the frame bundle F and K is a smooth function on M.

In the case of a Riemannian 2-manifold, the fundamental theorem of Riemannian geometry can be rephrased in terms of Cartan's canonical 1-forms:

Theorem. On an oriented Riemannian 2-manifold M, there is a unique connection ω on the frame bundle satisfying

$d\theta_1 = \omega\wedge\theta_2, \,\, d\theta_2= - \omega\wedge \theta_1$

In this case ω is called the Riemannian connection and K the Gaussian curvature.

The proof is elementary: if ω' is a second connection 1-form then

$$d\theta_1 = \omega^\prime\wedge\theta_2 + g_1\, \theta_1\wedge \theta_2,\,\,\,\, d\theta_2
= - \omega^\prime\wedge \theta_1 + g_2\, \theta_1\wedge \theta_2$$

for functions g_{i}; and their difference can be written

$$\omega^\prime - \omega = f_1 \theta_1 + f_2 \theta_2$$

for functions f_{i}. But then

$$d\theta_1 = \omega\wedge\theta_2 + (f_1 + g_1) \,\theta_1\wedge \theta_2, \,\,\,\, d\theta_2= - \omega\wedge \theta_1 + (f_2 +g_2)\,\theta_1 \wedge \theta_2.$$

Hence

$$d\theta_1=\omega\wedge \theta_2,\,\,\,\, d\theta_2 = -\omega\wedge \theta_1$$

if and only if f_{i} = -g_{i}. This proves both existence and uniqueness.

== Holonomy and curvature ==
Parallel transport in the frame bundle can be used to show that the Gaussian curvature of a surface M measures the amount of rotation obtained by translating vectors around small curves in M. Holonomy is exactly the phenomenon that occurs when a tangent vector (or orthonormal frame) is parallelly transported around a closed curve. The vector reached when the loop is closed will be a rotation of the original vector, i.e. it will correspond to an element of the rotation group SO(2), in other words an angle modulo 2π. This is the holonomy of the loop, because the angle does not depend on the choice of starting vector.

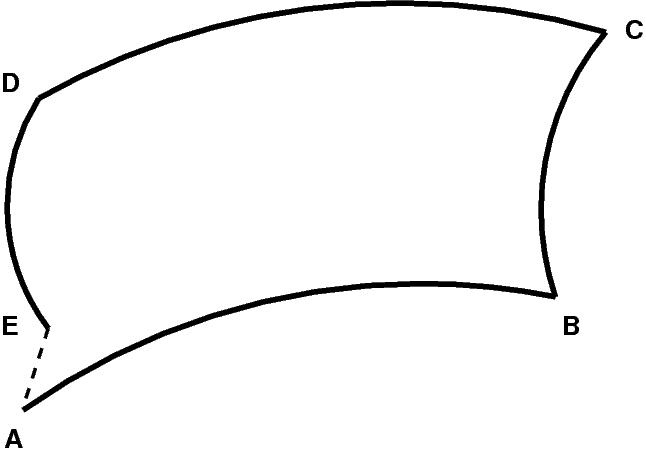
Geometric interpretation of the Lie bracket of two vector fields

This geometric interpretation of curvature relies on a similar geometric of the Lie bracket of two vector fields on F. Let U_{1} and U_{2} be vector fields on F with corresponding local flows α_{t} and β_{t}.

- Starting at a point A corresponding to x in F, travel $\sqrt{s}$ along the integral curve for U_{1} to the point B at $\alpha_{\sqrt{s}}(x)$.
- Travel from B by going $\sqrt{s}$ along the integral curve for U_{2} to the point C at $\beta_{\sqrt{s}} \alpha_{\sqrt{s}}(x)$.
- Travel from C by going $-\sqrt{s}$ along the integral curve for U_{1} to the point D at $\alpha_{-\sqrt{s}}\beta_{\sqrt{s}} \alpha_{\sqrt{s}}(x)$.
- Travel from D by going $-\sqrt{s}$ along the integral curve for U_{2} to the point E at $\beta_{-\sqrt{s}}\alpha_{-\sqrt{s}} \beta_{\sqrt{s}} \alpha_{\sqrt{s}}(x)$.

In general the end point E will differ from the starting point A. As s $\rightarrow$ 0, the end point E will trace out a curve through A. The Lie bracket [U_{1},U_{2}] at x is precisely the tangent vector to this curve at A.

To apply this theory, introduce vector fields U_{1}, U_{2} and V on the frame bundle F which are dual to the 1-forms θ_{1}, θ_{2} and ω at each point. Thus

$$\omega(U_i)=0, \, \theta_i(V) =0,\, \omega(V)=1,\, \theta_i(U_j)=\delta_{ij}.$$

Moreover, V is invariant under K and U_{1}, U_{2} transform according to the identity representation of K.

The structural equations of Cartan imply the following Lie bracket relations:

$[V,U_1]=U_2, \,\,\,\, [V,U_2]=-U_1, \,\,\, \, [U_1,U_2]=(K\circ\pi) V$

The geometrical interpretation of the Lie bracket can be applied to the last of these equations. Since ω(U_{i})=0, the flows α_{t} and β_{t} in F are lifts by parallel transport of their projections in M.

Informally the idea is as follows. The starting point A and end point E essentially differ by an element of SO(2), that is an angle of rotation. The area enclosed by the projected path in M is approximately $\sqrt{s}\cdot\sqrt{s}=s$. So in the limit as s $\rightarrow$ 0, the angle of rotation divided by this area tends to the coefficient of V, i.e. the curvature.

This reasoning is made precise in the following result.

Let f be a diffeomorphism of an open disc in the plane into M and let Δ be a triangle in this disc. Then the holonomy angle of the loop formed by the image under f of the perimeter of the triangle is given by the integral of the Gauss curvature of the image under f of the inside of the triangle.

In symbols, the holonomy angle mod 2π is given by

$\theta= \int_{f(\Delta)} K$

where the integral is with respect to the area form on M.

This result implies the relation between Gaussian curvature because as the triangle shrinks in size to a point, the ratio of this angle to the area tends to the Gaussian curvature at the point. The result can be proved by a combination of Stokes's theorem and Cartan's structural equations and can in turn be used to obtain a generalisation of Gauss's theorem on geodesics triangles to more general triangles.

One of the other standard approaches to curvature, through the covariant derivative $\nabla_X$, identifies the difference

$$R(X,Y)=\nabla_X \nabla_Y - \nabla_Y\nabla_X - \nabla_{[X,Y]}$$

as a field of endomorphisms of the tangent bundle, the Riemann curvature tensor. Since $\nabla_X$ is induced by the lifted vector field X* on F, the use of the vector fields U_{i} and V and their Lie brackets is more or less equivalent to this approach. The vertical vector field W=A* corresponding to the canonical generator A of $\mathfrak k$ could also be added since it commutes with V and satisfies [W,U_{1}] = U_{2} and [W,U_{2}] = —U_{1}.

== Example: the 2-sphere ==
The differential geometry of the 2-sphere can be approached from three different points of view:

- analytic geometry, since the 2-sphere is a submanifold of E^{3};
- group theory, since the compact matrix group SO(3) acts transitively on the 2-sphere as a continuous group of symmetries;
- classical mechanics, since a rigid 2-sphere can roll on a plane.

S^{2} can be identified with the unit sphere in E^{3}

$$S^2=\{a\in E^3\colon\|a\|=1\}.$$

Its tangent bundle T, unit tangent bundle U and oriented orthonormal frame bundle E are given by

$$T=\{(a,v)\colon \|a\|=1,\, a\cdot v=0\},$$
$$U=\{(a,v)\colon\|a\|=1, \,\|v\|=1,\, a\cdot v=0\},$$
$$E=\{(a,e_1,e_2)\colon (e_1 \times e_2)\cdot a=1, \, \|a\|=1, \, \|e_i\|=1, \, a\cdot e_i = 0, \, e_1\cdot e_2=0 \}.$$

The map sending (a,v) to (a, v, a x v) allows U and E to be identified.

Let

$$Q(a)v= (v\cdot a) a$$

be the orthogonal projection onto the normal vector at a, so that

$$P(a) = I-Q(a)$$

is the orthogonal projection onto the tangent space at a.

The group G = SO(3) acts by rotation on E^{3} leaving S^{2} invariant. The stabilizer subgroup K of the vector (1,0,0) in E_{3} may be identified with SO(2) and hence

S^{2} may be identified with SO(3)/SO(2).

This action extends to an action on T, U and E by making G act on each component. G acts transitively on S^{2} and simply transitively on U and E.

The action of SO(3) on E commutes with the action of SO(2) on E that rotates frames

$$(e_1,e_2)\mapsto (\cos \theta \, e_1 - \sin \theta \,e_2, \sin \theta\, e_1 + \cos \theta \,e_2).$$

Thus E becomes a principal bundle with structure group K. Taking the G-orbit of the point ((1,0,0),(0,1,0),(0,0,1)), the space E may be identified with G. Under this identification the actions of G and K on E become left and right translation. In other words:

The oriented orthonormal frame bundle of S^{2} may be identified with SO(3).

The Lie algebra $\mathfrak g$ of SO(3) consists of all skew-symmetric real 3 x 3 matrices. the adjoint action of G by conjugation on $\mathfrak g$ reproduces the action of G on E^{3}. The group SU(2) has a 3-dimensional Lie algebra consisting of complex skew-hermitian traceless 2 x 2 matrices, which is isomorphic to $\mathfrak g$. The adjoint action of SU(2) factors through its centre, the matrices ± I. Under these identifications, SU(2) is exhibited as a double cover of SO(3), so that SO(3) = SU(2) / ± I. On the other hand, SU(2) is diffeomorphic to the 3-sphere and under this identification the standard Riemannian metric on the 3-sphere becomes the essentially unique biinvariant Riemannian metric on SU(2). Under the quotient by ± I, SO(3) can be identified with the real projective space of dimension 3 and itself has an essentially unique biinvariant Riemannian metric. The geometric exponential map for this metric at I coincides with the usual exponential function on matrices and thus the geodesics through I have the form exp Xt where X is a skew-symmetric matrix. In this case the Sasaki metric agrees with this biinvariant metric on SO(3).

The actions of G on itself, and hence on C^{∞}(G) by left and right translation induce infinitesimal actions of $\mathfrak g$ on C^{∞}(G) by vector fields

$$\lambda(X) f(g)={d\over dt}f(e^{-Xt}g)|_{t=0},\,\rho(X) f(g)={d\over dt}f(ge^{Xt})|_{t=0}.$$

The right and left invariant vector fields are related by the formula

$$\lambda(X)f(g)=-\rho(g^{-1}Xg)f(g).$$

The vector fields λ(X) and ρ(X) commute with right and left translation and give all right and left invariant vector fields on G. Since C^{∞}(S^{2}) = C^{∞}(G/K) can be identified with C^{∞}(G)^{K}, the function invariant under right translation by K, the operators λ(X) also induces vector fields Π(X) on S^{2}.

Let A, B, C be the standard basis of $\mathfrak g$ given by

$$A=  \begin{pmatrix} 0 &  1 & 0 \\ -1 & 0 & 0 \\ 0 & 0 & 0\end{pmatrix},\,\,B=\begin{pmatrix} 0 & 0  & 0 \\ 0 & 0 & 1 \\ 0 & -1 & 0\end{pmatrix},
\,\, C=\begin{pmatrix} 0 &  0 & 1 \\ 0 & 0 & 0 \\ -1 & 0 & 0\end{pmatrix}.$$

Their Lie brackets [X,Y] = XY – YX are given by

$$[A,B]=C,\,\,[B,C]=A,\,\, [C,A]=B.$$

The vector fields λ(A), λ(B), λ(C) form a basis of the tangent space at each point of G.

Similarly the left invariant vector fields ρ(A), ρ(B), ρ(C) form a basis of the tangent space at each point of G. Let α, β, γ be the corresponding dual basis of left invariant 1-forms on G. The Lie bracket relations imply the Maurer–Cartan equations

$$d\alpha =\beta\wedge \gamma,\,\, d\beta= \gamma\wedge \alpha, \,\, d\gamma=\alpha\wedge\beta.$$

These are also the corresponding components of the Maurer–Cartan form

$$\omega_G=g^{-1}dg,$$

a left invariant matrix-valued 1-form on G, which satisfies the relation

$$d\omega_G = -(g^{-1} dg\, g^{-1})dg = -\omega_G\wedge \omega_G.$$

The inner product on $\mathfrak g$ defined by

$$(X,Y)= \mathrm{Tr}\, XY^T$$

is invariant under the adjoint action. Let π be the orthogonal projection onto the subspace generated by A, i.e. onto $\mathfrak k$, the Lie algebra of K. For X in $\mathfrak g$, the lift of the vector field Π(X) from C^{∞}(G/K) to C^{∞}(G) is given by the formula

$\Pi(X)^* f(g) = -\rho(\pi(g^{-1}Xg))f(g)$

This lift is G-equivariant on vector fields of the form Π(X) and has a unique extension to more general vector fields on G / K.

The left invariant 1-form α is the connection form ω on G corresponding to this lift. The other two 1-forms in the Cartan structural equations are given by θ_{1} = β and θ_{2} = γ. The structural equations themselves are just the Maurer–Cartan equations. In other words;

The Cartan structural equations for SO(3)/SO(2) reduce to the Maurer–Cartan equations for the left invariant 1-forms on SO(3).

Since α is the connection form,

- vertical vector fields on G are those of the form f · λ(A) with f in C^{∞}(G);
- horizontal vector fields on G are those of the form f_{1} · λ(B) + f_{2} · λ(C) with f_{i} in C^{∞}(G).

The existence of the basis vector fields λ(A), λ(B), λ(C) shows that SO(3) is parallelizable. This is not true for SO(3)/SO(2) by the hairy ball theorem: S^{2} does not admit any nowhere vanishing vector fields.

Parallel transport in the frame bundle amounts to lifting a path from SO(3)/SO(2) to SO(3). It can be accomplished by directly solving a matrix-valued ordinary differential equation ("transport equation") of the form g_{t} = A · g where A(t) is skew-symmetric and g takes values in SO(3).

In fact it is equivalent and more convenient to lift a path from SO(3)/O(2) to SO(3). Note that O(2) is the normaliser of SO(2) in SO(3) and the quotient group O(2)/SO(2), the so-called Weyl group, is a group of order 2 which acts on SO(3)/SO(2) = S^{2} as the antipodal map. The quotient SO(3)/O(2) is the real projective plane. It can be identified with space of rank one or rank two projections Q in M_{3}(R). Taking Q to be a rank 2 projection and setting F = 2Q − I, a model of the surface SO(3)/O(2) is given by matrices F satisfying F^{2} = I, F = F^{T} and Tr F = 1. Taking F_{0}= diag (–1,1,1) as base point, every F can be written in the form g F_{0} g^{−1}.

Given a path F(t), the ordinary differential equation $g_t g^{-1} = F_t F/2$, with initial condition $g(0)=I$, has a unique C^{1} solution g(t) with values in G, giving the lift by parallel transport of F.

If Q(t) is the corresponding path of rank 2 projections, the conditions for parallel transport are

$$Q = gQ_0 g^{-1},\,\, Q_0 g^{-1} \dot{g} Q_0 = 0$$

Set A = ½F_{t} F. Since F^{2} = I and F is symmetric, A is skew-symmetric and satisfies QAQ = 0.

The unique solution g(t) of the ordinary differential equation

$$\dot{g} = A g \,$$

with initial condition g(0) = I guaranteed by the Picard–Lindelöf theorem, must have g^{T}g constant and therefore I, since

$${d\over dt} (g^T g)= \dot{g}^Tg +g^T\dot{g}= g^T(A^T +A)g=0.$$

Moreover,

$$F(t) = g(t) F(0) g(t)^{-1} \,$$

since g^{−1}Fg has derivative 0:

$${d\over dt} (g^{-1}Fg) = -g^{-1} \dot{g} g^{-1} Fg + g^{-1}\dot{F} g + g^{-1}F\dot{g} = g^{-1}(-\dot{g}g^{-1}F + \dot{F} +F \dot{g}g^{-1})g=0.$$

Hence Q = g Q_{0} g^{−1}. The condition QAQ=0 implies Q g_{t} g^{−1} Q = 0 and hence that Q_{0} g^{−1} g_{t} Q_{0} =0.

There is another kinematic way of understanding parallel transport and geodesic curvature in terms of "rolling without slipping or twisting". Although well known to differential geometers since the early part of the twentieth century, it has also been applied to problems in engineering and robotics. Consider the 2-sphere as a rigid body in three-dimensional space rolling without slipping or twisting on a horizontal plane. The point of contact will describe a curve in the plane and on the surface. At each point of contact the different tangent planes of the sphere can be identified with the horizontal plane itself and hence with one another.

- The usual curvature of the planar curve is the geodesic curvature of the curve traced on the sphere.
- This identification of the tangent planes along the curve corresponds to parallel transport.

This is particularly easy to visualize for a sphere: it is exactly the way a marble can be rolled along a perfectly flat table top.

The roles of the plane and the sphere can be reversed to provide an alternative but equivalent point of view. The sphere is regarded as fixed and the plane has to roll without slipping or twisting along the given curve on the sphere.

== Embedded surfaces ==
When a surface M is embedded in E^{3}, the Gauss map from M $\rightarrow$ S^{2} extends to a SO(2)-equivariant map between the orthonormal frame bundles E $\rightarrow$ SO(3). Indeed, the triad consisting of the tangent frame and the normal vector gives an element of SO(3).

In 1956 Kobayashi proved that:

Under the extended Gauss map, the connection on SO(3) induces the connection on E.

This means that the forms ω, θ_{1} and θ_{2} on E are obtained by pulling back those on SO(3); and that lifting paths from M to E can be accomplished by mapping the path to the 2-sphere, lifting the path to SO(3) and then pulling back the lift to E. Thus for embedded surfaces, the 2-sphere with the principal connection on its frame bundle provides a "universal model", the prototype for the universal bundles discussed in Narasimhan & Ramanan (1961).

In more concrete terms this allows parallel transport to be described explicitly using the transport equation. Parallel transport along a curve c(t), with t taking values in [0,1], starting from a tangent from a tangent vector v_{0} also amounts to finding a map v(t) from [0,1] to R^{3} such that

- v(t) is a tangent vector to M at c(t) with v(0) = v_{0}.
- the velocity vector $\dot{v}(t)$ is normal to the surface at c(t), i.e. P(c(t))v(t)=0.

This always has a unique solution, called the parallel transport of v_{0} along c.

The existence of parallel transport can be deduced using the analytic method described for SO(3)/SO(2), which from a path into the rank two projections Q(t) starting at Q_{0} produced a path g(t) in SO(3) starting at I such that

$$Q = g Q_0 g^{-1}, \, \, \,Q_0 g^{-1} \dot{g} Q_0= 0.$$

g(t) is the unique solution of the transport equation

g_{t}g^{−1} = ½ F_{t} F

with g(0) = I and F = 2Q − I. Applying this with Q(t) = P(c(t)), it follows that, given a tangent vector v_{0} in the tangent space to M at c(0), the vector v(t)=g(t)v_{0} lies in the tangent space to M at c(t) and satisfies the equation

$$P(c(t))\dot{v}(t) =0.$$

It therefore is exactly the parallel transport of v along the curve c. In this case the length of the vector v(t) is constant. More generally if another initial tangent vector u_{0} is taken instead of v_{0}, the inner product (v(t),u(t)) is constant. The tangent spaces along the curve c(t) are thus canonically identified as inner product spaces by parallel transport so that parallel transport gives an isometry between the tangent planes. The condition on the velocity vector $\dot{v}(t)$ may be rewritten in terms of the covariant derivative as

$\nabla_{\dot{c}} v = 0$

the defining equation for parallel transport.

The kinematic way of understanding parallel transport for the sphere applies equally well to any closed surface in E^{3} regarded as a rigid body in three-dimensional space rolling without slipping or twisting on a horizontal plane. The point of contact will describe a curve in the plane and on the surface. As for the sphere, the usual curvature of the planar curve equals the geodesic curvature of the curve traced on the surface.

This geometric way of viewing parallel transport can also be directly expressed in the language of geometry. The envelope of the tangent planes to M along a curve c is a surface with vanishing Gaussian curvature, which by Minding's theorem, must be locally isometric to the Euclidean plane. This identification allows parallel transport to be defined, because in the Euclidean plane all tangent planes are identified with the space itself.

There is another simple way of constructing the connection form ω using the embedding of M in E^{3}.

The tangent vectors e_{1} and e_{2} of a frame on M define smooth functions from E with values in R^{3}, so each gives a 3-vector of functions and in particular de_{1} is a 3-vector of 1-forms on E.

The connection form is given by

$\omega= de_1 \cdot e_2$

taking the usual scalar product on 3-vectors.

== Gauss–Codazzi equations ==
When M is embedded in E^{3}, two other 1-forms ψ and χ can be defined on the frame bundle E using the shape operator. Indeed, the Gauss map induces a K-equivariant map of E into SO(3), the frame bundle of S^{2} = SO(3)/SO(2). The form ω is the pullback of one of the three right invariant Maurer–Cartan forms on SO(3). The 1-forms ψ and χ are defined to be the pullbacks of the other two.

These 1-forms satisfy the following structure equations:

$\psi\wedge \theta_1 + \chi\wedge \theta_2=0$

(symmetry equation)

$d\omega= \psi\wedge \chi$

(Gauss equation)

$d\psi=\chi\wedge\omega, \,\, d\chi=\omega\wedge\psi$

(Codazzi equations)

The Gauss–Codazzi equations for χ, ψ and ω follow immediately from the Maurer–Cartan equations for the three right invariant 1-forms on SO(3).

== Reading guide ==
One of the most comprehensive introductory surveys of the subject, charting the historical development from before Gauss to modern times, is by Berger (2004). Graduate-level treatments of the Riemannian connection can be found in Singer & Thorpe (1967), do Carmo (1976) and O'Neill (1997). Accessible introductions to Cartan's approach to connections using moving frames can be found in Ivey & Landsberg (2003) and Sharpe (1997). Classic treatments of principal bundles and connections can be found in Nomizu (1956), Kobayashi & Nomizu (1963), Sternberg (1964) and Chapter XX of Dieudonné (1974).

== See also ==
- Differential geometry of surfaces
