= Connection form =

Math/physics concept

In mathematics, and specifically differential geometry, a connection form is a manner of organizing the data of a connection using the language of moving frames and differential forms.

Historically, connection forms were introduced by Élie Cartan in the first half of the 20th century as part of, and one of the principal motivations for, his method of moving frames. The connection form generally depends on a choice of a coordinate frame, and so is not a tensorial object. Various generalizations and reinterpretations of the connection form were formulated subsequent to Cartan's initial work. In particular, on a principal bundle, a principal connection is a natural reinterpretation of the connection form as a tensorial object. On the other hand, the connection form has the advantage that it is a differential form defined on the differentiable manifold, rather than on an abstract principal bundle over it. Hence, despite their lack of tensoriality, connection forms continue to be used because of the relative ease of performing calculations with them. In physics, connection forms are also used broadly in the context of gauge theory, through the gauge covariant derivative.

A connection form associates to each basis of a vector bundle a matrix of differential forms. The connection form is not tensorial because under a change of basis, the connection form transforms in a manner that involves the exterior derivative of the transition functions, in much the same way as the Christoffel symbols for the Levi-Civita connection. The main tensorial invariant of a connection form is its curvature form. In the presence of a solder form identifying the vector bundle with the tangent bundle, there is an additional invariant: the torsion form. In many cases, connection forms are considered on vector bundles with additional structure: that of a fiber bundle with a structure group.

== Vector bundles ==
=== Frames on a vector bundle ===
Let $E$ be a vector bundle of fibre dimension $k$ over a differentiable manifold $M$. A local frame for $E$ is an ordered basis of local sections of $E$. It is always possible to construct a local frame, as vector bundles are always defined in terms of local trivializations, in analogy to the atlas of a manifold. That is, given any point $x$ on the base manifold $M$, there exists an open neighborhood $U \subseteq M$ of $x$ for which the vector bundle over $U$ is locally trivial, that is isomorphic to $U \times \mathbb R^k$ projecting to $U$. The vector space structure on $\mathbb R^k$ can thereby be extended to the entire local trivialization, and a basis on $\mathbb R^k$ can be extended as well; this defines the local frame. (Here the real numbers are used, although much of the development can be extended to modules over rings in general, and to vector spaces over complex numbers $\mathbb C$ in particular.)

Let $\mathbf e = (e_\alpha)_{\alpha = 1, 2, \dots, k}$ be a local frame on $E$. This frame can be used to express locally any section of $E$. For example, suppose that $\xi$ is a local section, defined over the same open set as the frame $\mathbb e$. Then

$$\xi = \sum_{\alpha=1}^k e_\alpha \xi^\alpha(\mathbf e)$$

where $\xi^\alpha(\mathbf e)$ denotes the components of $\xi$ in the frame $\mathbf e$. As a matrix equation, this reads

$$\xi = {\mathbf e}
\begin{bmatrix}
\xi^1(\mathbf e)\\
\xi^2(\mathbf e)\\
\vdots\\
\xi^k(\mathbf e)
\end{bmatrix}=
{\mathbf e}\, \xi(\mathbf e)$$

In general relativity, such frame fields are referred to as tetrads. The tetrad specifically relates the local frame to an explicit coordinate system on the base manifold $M$ (the coordinate system on $M$ being established by the atlas).

=== Exterior connections ===
A connection in $E$ is a type of differential operator

$$D : \Gamma(E) \rightarrow \Gamma(E\otimes T^*M) = \Gamma(E)\otimes\Omega^1M$$

where $\Gamma$ denotes the sheaf of local sections of a vector bundle, and $\Omega^1M$ is the module of differential 1-forms on $M$. For $D$ to be a connection, it must be correctly coupled to the exterior derivative. Specifically, if $v$ is a local section of $E$, and $f$ is a smooth function, then

$$D(fv) = v\otimes (df) + fDv$$

where $df$ is the exterior derivative of $f$.

Sometimes it is convenient to extend the definition of $D$ to arbitrary E-valued forms, thus regarding it as a differential operator on the tensor product of $E$ with the full exterior algebra of differential forms. Given an exterior connection $D$ satisfying this compatibility property, there exists a unique extension of $D$:

$$D : \Gamma(E\otimes\Lambda^*T^*M) \rightarrow \Gamma(E\otimes\Lambda^*T^*M)$$

such that

$$D(v\wedge\alpha) = (Dv)\wedge\alpha + (-1)^{\text{deg}\, v}v\wedge d\alpha$$

where $v$ is homogeneous of degree $\deg v$. In other words, $D$ is a derivation on the sheaf of graded modules $\Gamma(E\otimes\Omega^*M)$.

=== Connection forms ===
The connection form arises when applying the exterior connection to a particular frame $\mathbf{e}$. Upon applying the exterior connection to the $e_{\alpha}$, it is the unique $k\times k$ matrix $(\omega_{\alpha}{}^{\beta})$ of one-forms on $M$ such that

$$D e_\alpha = \sum_{\beta=1}^k e_\beta\otimes\omega^\beta_\alpha.$$

In terms of the connection form, the exterior connection of any section of $E$ can now be expressed. For example, suppose that $\xi=\sum_{\alpha}e_{\alpha}\xi^{\alpha}$. Then

$$D\xi = \sum_{\alpha=1}^k D(e_\alpha\xi^\alpha(\mathbf e)) = \sum_{\alpha=1}^k e_\alpha\otimes d\xi^\alpha(\mathbf e) + \sum_{\alpha=1}^k\sum_{\beta=1}^k e_\beta\otimes\omega^\beta_\alpha \xi^\alpha(\mathbf e).$$

Taking components on both sides,

$$D\xi(\mathbf e) = d\xi(\mathbf e)+\omega \xi(\mathbf e) = (d+\omega)\xi(\mathbf e)$$

where it is understood that $d$ and $\omega$ refer to the component-wise derivative with respect to the frame $\mathbf{e}$, and a matrix of 1-forms, respectively, acting on the components of $\xi$. Conversely, a matrix of 1-forms $\omega$ is a priori sufficient to completely determine the connection locally on the open set over which the basis of sections $\mathbf{e}$ is defined.

==== Change of frame ====
In order to extend $\omega$ to a suitable global object, it is necessary to examine how it behaves when a different choice of basic sections of $E$ is chosen. Write $\omega_{\alpha}^{\beta}=\omega_{\alpha}^{\beta}(\mathbf{e})$ to indicate the dependence on the choice of $\mathbf{e}$.

Suppose that $\mathbf{e}'$ is a different choice of local basis. Then there is an invertible $k\times k$ matrix of functions $g$ such that

$${\mathbf e}' = {\mathbf e}\, g,\quad \text{i.e., }\,e'_\alpha = \sum_\beta e_\beta g^\beta_\alpha.$$

Applying the exterior connection to both sides gives the transformation law for $\omega$:

$$\omega(\mathbf e\, g) = g^{-1}dg+g^{-1}\omega(\mathbf e)g.$$

Note in particular that $\omega$ fails to transform in a tensorial manner, since the rule for passing from one frame to another involves the derivatives of the transition matrix $g$.

==== Global connection forms ====
If $\{U_p\}$ is an open covering of $M$, and each $U_p$ is equipped with a trivialization $\mathbf{e}_p$ of $E$, then it is possible to define a global connection form in terms of the patching data between the local connection forms on the overlap regions. In detail, a connection form on $M$ is a system of matrices $\omega(\mathbf{e}_p)$ of 1-forms defined on each $U_p$ that satisfy the following compatibility condition

$$\omega(\mathbf e_q) = (\mathbf e_p^{-1}\mathbf e_q)^{-1}d(\mathbf e_p^{-1}\mathbf e_q)+(\mathbf e_p^{-1}\mathbf e_q)^{-1}\omega(\mathbf e_p)(\mathbf e_p^{-1}\mathbf e_q).$$

This compatibility condition ensures in particular that the exterior connection of a section of $E$, when regarded abstractly as a section of $E\otimes\Omega^1M$, does not depend on the choice of basis section used to define the connection.

=== Curvature ===
The curvature two-form of a connection form in $E$ is defined by

$$\Omega(\mathbf e) = d\omega(\mathbf e) + \omega(\mathbf e)\wedge\omega(\mathbf e).$$

Unlike the connection form, the curvature behaves tensorially under a change of frame, which can be checked directly by using the Poincaré lemma. Specifically, if e → e $g$ is a change of frame, then the curvature two-form transforms by

$$\Omega(\mathbf e\, g) = g^{-1}\Omega(\mathbf e)g.$$

One interpretation of this transformation law is as follows. Let $\mathbf{e}^*$ be the dual basis corresponding to the frame $\mathbf{e}$. Then the 2-form

$$\Omega={\mathbf e}\Omega(\mathbf e){\mathbf e}^*$$

is independent of the choice of frame. In particular, $\Omega$ is a vector-valued two-form on $M$ with values in the endomorphism ring $\operatorname{Hom}(E,E)$. Symbolically,

$$\Omega\in \Gamma(\Lambda^2T^*M\otimes \text{Hom}(E,E)).$$

In terms of the exterior connection $D$, the curvature endomorphism is given by

$$\Omega(v) = D(D v) = D^2v$$

for $v\in E$ (we can extend $v$ to a local section to define this expression). Thus the curvature measures the failure of the sequence

$$\Gamma(E)\ \stackrel{D}{\to}\ \Gamma(E\otimes\Lambda^1T^*M)\ \stackrel{D}{\to}\ \Gamma(E\otimes\Lambda^2T^*M)\ \stackrel{D}{\to}\ \dots\ \stackrel{D}{\to}\ \Gamma(E\otimes\Lambda^nT^*(M))$$

to be a chain complex (in the sense of de Rham cohomology).

=== Soldering and torsion ===
Suppose that the fibre dimension $k$ of $E$ is equal to the dimension of the manifold $M$. In this case, the vector bundle $E$ is sometimes equipped with an additional piece of data besides its connection: a solder form. A solder form is a globally defined vector-valued one-form $\theta\in\Omega^1(M,E)$ such that the mapping

$$\theta_x : T_xM \rightarrow E_x$$

is a linear isomorphism for all $x\in M$. If a solder form is given, then it is possible to define the torsion of the connection (in terms of the exterior connection) as

$$\Theta = D\theta.$$

The torsion $\Theta$ is an $E$-valued 2-form on $M$.

A solder form and the associated torsion may both be described in terms of a local frame $\mathbf{e}$ of $E$. If $\theta$ is a solder form, then it decomposes into the frame components

$$\theta = \sum_i \theta^i(\mathbf e) e_i.$$

The components of the torsion are then

$$\Theta^i(\mathbf e) = d\theta^i(\mathbf e) + \sum_j \omega_j^i(\mathbf e)\wedge \theta^j(\mathbf e).$$

Much like the curvature, it can be shown that $\Theta$ behaves as a contravariant tensor under a change in frame:

$$\Theta^i(\mathbf e\, g)=\sum_j g_j^i \Theta^j(\mathbf e).$$

The frame-independent torsion may also be recovered from the frame components:

$$\Theta = \sum_i e_i \Theta^i(\mathbf e).$$

=== Bianchi identities ===
The Bianchi identities relate the torsion to the curvature. The first Bianchi identity states that

$$D\Theta=\Omega\wedge\theta$$

while the second Bianchi identity states that

$$\, D \Omega = 0.$$

=== Example: the Levi-Civita connection ===
As an example, suppose that $M$ carries a Riemannian metric. If one has a vector bundle $E$ over $M$, then the metric can be extended to the entire vector bundle, as the bundle metric. One may then define a connection that is compatible with this bundle metric, this is the metric connection. For the special case of $E$ being the tangent bundle $TM$, the metric connection is called the Riemannian connection. Given a Riemannian connection, one can always find a unique, equivalent connection that is torsion-free. This is the Levi-Civita connection on the tangent bundle $TM$ of $M$.

A local frame on the tangent bundle is an ordered list of vector fields $\mathbf{e}=(e_i\mid i=1,2,\ldots,n)$, where $n=\dim M$, defined on an open subset of $M$ that are linearly independent at every point of their domain. The Christoffel symbols define the Levi-Civita connection by

$$\nabla_{e_i}e_j = \sum_{k=1}^n\Gamma_{ij}^k(\mathbf e)e_k.$$

If $\theta=\{\theta^i\mid i=1,2,\ldots,n\}$, denotes the dual basis of the cotangent bundle, such that $\theta^i(e_j)=\delta_{ij}$ (the Kronecker delta), then the connection form is

$$\omega_i^j(\mathbf e) = \sum_k \Gamma^j{}_{ki}(\mathbf e)\theta^k.$$

In terms of the connection form, the exterior connection on a vector field $v=\sum_ie_iv^i$ is given by

$$Dv=\sum_k e_k\otimes(dv^k) + \sum_{j,k}e_k\otimes\omega^k_j(\mathbf e)v^j.$$

One can recover the Levi-Civita connection, in the usual sense, from this by contracting with $e_i$:

$$\nabla_{e_i} v = \langle Dv, e_i\rangle = \sum_k e_k \left(\nabla_{e_i} v^k + \sum_j\Gamma^k_{ij}(\mathbf e)v^j\right)$$

==== Curvature ====
The curvature 2-form of the Levi-Civita connection is the matrix $(\Omega_i{}^j)$ given by

$$\Omega_i{}^j(\mathbf e) = d\omega_i{}^j(\mathbf e)+\sum_k\omega_k{}^j(\mathbf e)\wedge\omega_i{}^k(\mathbf e).$$

For simplicity, suppose that the frame $\mathbf{e}$ is holonomic, so that $d\theta^i=0$. Then, employing now the summation convention on repeated indices,

$$\begin{array}{ll}
\Omega_i{}^j &= d(\Gamma^j{}_{qi}\theta^q) + (\Gamma^j{}_{pk}\theta^p)\wedge(\Gamma^k{}_{qi}\theta^q)\\
&\\
&=\theta^p\wedge\theta^q\left(\partial_p\Gamma^j{}_{qi}+\Gamma^j{}_{pk}\Gamma^k{}_{qi})\right)\\
&\\
&=\tfrac12\theta^p\wedge\theta^q R_{pqi}{}^j
\end{array}$$

where $R$ is the Riemann curvature tensor.

==== Torsion ====
The Levi-Civita connection is characterized as the unique metric connection in the tangent bundle with zero torsion. To describe the torsion, note that the vector bundle $E$ is the tangent bundle. This carries a canonical solder form (sometimes called the canonical one-form, especially in the context of classical mechanics) that is the section $\theta$ of $\operatorname{Hom}(TM,TM)=T^*M\otimes TM$ corresponding to the identity endomorphism of the tangent spaces. In the frame $\mathbf{e}$, the solder form is $\theta=\sum_ie_i\otimes\theta^i$, where again $\theta^i$ is the dual basis.

The torsion of the connection is given by $\Theta=D\theta$, or in terms of the frame components of the solder form by

$$\Theta^i(\mathbf e) = d\theta^i+\sum_j\omega^i_j(\mathbf e)\wedge\theta^j.$$

Assuming again for simplicity that $\mathbf{e}$ is holonomic, this expression reduces to

$$\Theta^i = \Gamma^i{}_{kj} \theta^k\wedge\theta^j$$,

which vanishes if and only if $\Gamma^i_{kj}$ is symmetric on its lower indices.

Given a metric connection with torsion, one can always find a single, unique connection that is torsion-free, this is the Levi-Civita connection. The difference between a Riemannian connection and its associated Levi-Civita connection is the contorsion tensor.

== Structure groups ==
A more specific type of connection form can be constructed when the vector bundle $E$ carries a structure group. This amounts to a preferred class of frames $\mathbf{e}$ on $E$, which are related by a Lie group $G$. For example, in the presence of a metric in $E$, one works with frames that form an orthonormal basis at each point. The structure group is then the orthogonal group, since this group preserves the orthonormality of frames. Other examples include:

- The usual frames, considered in the preceding section, have structural group $\operatorname{GL}(k)$ where $k$ is the fibre dimension of $E$.
- The holomorphic tangent bundle of a complex manifold (or almost complex manifold). Here the structure group is $\operatorname{GL}_n(\mathbb{C})\subset\operatorname{GL}_{2n}(\mathbb{R})$. In case a hermitian metric is given, then the structure group reduces to the unitary group acting on unitary frames.
- Spinors on a manifold equipped with a spin structure. The frames are unitary with respect to an invariant inner product on the spin space, and the group reduces to the spin group.
- Holomorphic tangent bundles on CR manifolds.

In general, let $E$ be a given vector bundle of fibre dimension $k$ and $G\subset\operatorname{GL}(k)$ a given Lie subgroup of the general linear group of $\mathbb{R}^k$. If $(e_{\alpha})$ is a local frame of $E$, then a matrix-valued function $(g_i^j):M\rightarrow G$ may act on the $e_{\alpha}$ to produce a new frame

$$e_\alpha' = \sum_\beta e_\beta g_\alpha^\beta.$$

Two such frames are G-related. Informally, the vector bundle $E$ has the structure of a G-bundle if a preferred class of frames is specified, all of which are locally $G$-related to each other. In formal terms, $E$ is a fibre bundle with structure group $G$ whose typical fibre is $\mathbb{R}^k$ with the natural action of $G$ as a subgroup of $\operatorname{GL}(k)$.

=== Compatible connections ===
A connection is compatible with the structure of a $G$-bundle on $E$ provided that the associated parallel transport maps always send one $G$-frame to another. Formally, along a curve $\gamma$, the following must hold locally (that is, for sufficiently small values of $t$):

$$\Gamma(\gamma)_0^t e_\alpha(\gamma(0)) = \sum_\beta e_\beta(\gamma(t))g_\alpha^\beta(t)$$

for some matrix $g_{\alpha}^{\beta}$ (which may also depend on $t$). Differentiation at $t=0$ gives

$$\nabla_{\dot{\gamma}(0)} e_\alpha = \sum_\beta e_\beta \omega_\alpha^\beta(\dot{\gamma}(0))$$

where the coefficients $\omega_{\alpha}^{\beta}$ are in the Lie algebra $\mathfrak{g}$ of the Lie group $G$.

With this observation, the connection form $\omega_{\alpha}^{\beta}$ defined by

$$D e_\alpha = \sum_\beta e_\beta\otimes \omega_\alpha^\beta(\mathbf e)$$

is compatible with the structure if the matrix of one-forms $\omega_{\alpha}^{\beta}(\mathbf{e})$ takes its values in $\mathfrak{g}$.

The curvature form of a compatible connection is, moreover, a $\mathfrak{g}$-valued two-form.

=== Change of frame ===
Under a change of frame

$$e_\alpha' = \sum_\beta e_\beta g_\alpha^\beta$$

where $g$ is a $G$-valued function defined on an open subset of $M$, the connection form transforms via

$$\omega_\alpha^\beta(\mathbf e\cdot g) = (g^{-1})_\gamma^\beta dg_\alpha^\gamma + (g^{-1})_\gamma^\beta \omega_\delta^\gamma(\mathbf e)g_\alpha^\delta.$$

Or, using matrix products:

$$\omega({\mathbf e}\cdot g) = g^{-1}dg + g^{-1}\omega g.$$

To interpret each of these terms, recall that $g:M\rightarrow G$ is a $G$-valued (locally defined) function. With this in mind,

$$\omega({\mathbf e}\cdot g) = g^*\omega_{\mathfrak g} + \text{Ad}_{g^{-1}}\omega(\mathbf e)$$

where $\omega_{\mathfrak{g}}$ is the Maurer-Cartan form for the group $G$, here pulled back to $M$ along the function $g$, and $\operatorname{Ad}$ is the adjoint representation of $G$ on its Lie algebra.

== Principal bundles ==
The connection form, as introduced thus far, depends on a particular choice of frame. In the first definition, the frame is just a local basis of sections. To each frame, a connection form is given with a transformation law for passing from one frame to another. In the second definition, the frames themselves carry some additional structure provided by a Lie group, and changes of frame are constrained to those that take their values in it. The language of principal bundles, pioneered by Charles Ehresmann in the 1940s, provides a manner of organizing these many connection forms and the transformation laws connecting them into a single intrinsic form with a single rule for transformation. The disadvantage to this approach is that the forms are no longer defined on the manifold itself, but rather on a larger principal bundle.

=== The principal connection for a connection form ===
Suppose that $E\rightarrow M$ is a vector bundle with structure group $G$. Let $\{U\}$ be an open cover of $M$, along with $G$-frames on each $U$, denoted by $\mathbf{e}_U$. These are related on the intersections of overlapping open sets by

$${\mathbf e}_V={\mathbf e}_U\cdot h_{UV}$$

for some $G$-valued function $h_{UV}$ defined on $U\cap V$.

Let $\text{F}_GE$ be the set of all $G$-frames taken over each point of $M$. This is a principal $G$-bundle over $M$. In detail, using the fact that the $G$-frames are all $G$-related, $\text{F}_GE$ can be realized in terms of gluing data among the sets of the open cover:

$$F_GE = \left.\coprod_U U\times G\right/\sim$$

where the equivalence relation $\sim$ is defined by

$$((x,g_U)\in U\times G) \sim ((x,g_V) \in V\times G) \iff {\mathbf e}_V={\mathbf e}_U\cdot h_{UV} \text{ and } g_U = h_{UV}^{-1}(x) g_V.$$

On $\text{F}_GE$, define a principal G-connection as follows, by specifying a $\mathfrak{g}$-valued one-form on each product $U\times G$, which respects the equivalence relation on the overlap regions. First let

$$\pi_1:U\times G \to U,\quad \pi_2 : U\times G \to G$$

be the projection maps. Now, for a point $(x,g)\in U\times G$, set

$$\omega_{(x,g)} = Ad_{g^{-1}}\pi_1^*\omega(\mathbf e_U)+\pi_2^*\omega_{\mathbf g}.$$

The 1-form $\omega$ constructed in this way respects the transitions between overlapping sets, and therefore descends to give a globally defined 1-form on the principal bundle $\text{F}_GE$. It can be shown that $\omega$ is a principal connection in the sense that it reproduces the generators of the right $G$ action on $\text{F}_GE$, and equivariantly intertwines the right action on $T(\text{F}_GE)$ with the adjoint representation of $G$.

=== Connection forms associated to a principal connection ===
Conversely, a principal $G$-connection $\omega$ in a principal $G$-bundle $P\rightarrow M$ gives rise to a collection of connection forms on $M$. Suppose that $\mathbf{e}:M\rightarrow P$ is a local section of $P$. Then the pullback of $\omega$ along $\mathbf{e}$ defines a $\mathfrak{g}$-valued one-form on $M$:

$$\omega({\mathbf e}) = {\mathbf e}^*\omega.$$

Changing frames by a $G$-valued function $g$, one sees that $\omega(\mathbf{e})$ transforms in the required manner by using the Leibniz rule, and the adjunction:

$$\langle X, ({\mathbf e}\cdot g)^*\omega\rangle = \langle [d(\mathbf e\cdot g)](X), \omega\rangle$$

where $X$ is a vector on $M$, and $d$ denotes the pushforward.

== See also ==
- Ehresmann connection
- Cartan connection
- Affine connection
- Curvature form
