= Metric compatibility =

Metric compatibility may refer to:

- In typography, compatibility with font metrics
- In mathematics, compatibility with the metric connection
- In measurements, compatibility with the metric system
