= Connection (vector bundle) =

Defines a notion of parallel transport on a bundle

In mathematics, and especially differential geometry and gauge theory, a connection on a fiber bundle is a device that defines a notion of parallel transport on the bundle; that is, a way to "connect" or identify fibers over nearby points. The most common case is that of a linear connection on a vector bundle, for which the notion of parallel transport must be linear. A linear connection is equivalently specified by a covariant derivative, an operator that differentiates sections of the bundle along tangent directions in the base manifold, in such a way that parallel sections have derivative zero. Linear connections generalize, to arbitrary vector bundles, the Levi-Civita connection on the tangent bundle of a pseudo-Riemannian manifold, which gives a standard way to differentiate vector fields. Nonlinear connections generalize this concept to bundles whose fibers are not necessarily linear.

Linear connections are also called Koszul connections after Jean-Louis Koszul, who gave an algebraic framework for describing them (Koszul 1950).

This article defines the connection on a vector bundle using a common mathematical notation which de-emphasizes coordinates. However, other notations are also regularly used: in general relativity, vector bundle computations are usually written using indexed tensors; in gauge theory, the endomorphisms of the vector space fibers are emphasized. The different notations are equivalent, as discussed in the article on metric connections (the comments made there apply to all vector bundles).

== Motivation ==
Let M be a differentiable manifold, such as Euclidean space. A vector-valued function $M \to \mathbb{R}^n$ can be viewed as a section of the trivial vector bundle $M\times \mathbb{R}^n \to M.$ One may consider a section of a general differentiable vector bundle, and it is therefore natural to ask if it is possible to differentiate a section, as a generalization of how one differentiates a function on M.

A section of a bundle may be viewed as a generalized function from the base into the fibers of the vector bundle. This can be visualized by the graph of the section, as in the figure above.

The model case is to differentiate a function $X: \mathbb{R}^n \to \mathbb{R}^m$ on Euclidean space $\mathbb{R}^n$. In this setting the derivative $dX$ at a point $x\in \mathbb{R}^n$ in the direction $v\in \mathbb{R}^n$ may be defined by the standard formula

$$dX(v)(x) = \lim_{t\to 0} \frac{X(x+tv) - X(x)}{t}.$$

For every $x\in \mathbb{R}^n$, this defines a new vector $dX(v)(x)\in\mathbb{R}^m.$

When passing to a section $X$ of a vector bundle $E$ over a manifold $M$, one encounters two key issues with this definition. Firstly, since the manifold has no linear structure, the term $x+tv$ makes no sense on $M$. Instead one takes a path $\gamma: (-1,1) \to M$ such that $\gamma(0) = x, \gamma'(0) = v$ and computes

$$dX(v)(x) = \lim_{t\to 0} \frac{X(\gamma(t)) - X(\gamma(0))}{t}.$$

However this still does not make sense, because $X(\gamma(t))$ and $X(\gamma(0))$ are elements of the distinct vector spaces $E_{\gamma(t)}$ and $E_x.$ This means that subtraction of these two terms is not naturally defined.

The problem is resolved by introducing the extra structure of a connection to the vector bundle. There are at least three perspectives from which connections can be understood. When formulated precisely, all three perspectives are equivalent.

1. (Parallel transport) A connection can be viewed as assigning to every differentiable path $\gamma$ a linear isomorphism $P_t^{\gamma} : E_{\gamma(t)} \to E_{x}$ for all $t.$ Using this isomorphism one can transport $X(\gamma(t))$ to the fibre $E_x$ and then take the difference; explicitly,
  $$\nabla_vX = \lim_{t\to 0} \frac{P_{t}^{\gamma} X(\gamma(t)) - X(\gamma(0))}{t}.$$
  In order for this to depend only on $v,$ and not on the path $\gamma$ extending $v,$ it is necessary to place restrictions (in the definition) on the dependence of $P_t^{\gamma}$ on $\gamma.$ This is not straightforward to formulate, and so this notion of "parallel transport" is usually derived as a by-product of other ways of defining connections. In fact, the following notion of "Ehresmann connection" is nothing but an infinitesimal formulation of parallel transport.
2. (Ehresmann connection) The section $X$ may be viewed as a smooth map from the smooth manifold $M$ to the smooth manifold $E.$ As such, one may consider the pushforward $dX(v),$ which is an element of the tangent space $T_{X(x)}E.$ In Ehresmann's formulation of a connection, one chooses a way of assigning, to each $x$ and every $e\in E_x,$ a direct sum decomposition of $T_{X(x)}E$ into two linear subspaces, one of which is the natural embedding of $E_x.$ With this additional data, one defines $\nabla_vX$ by projecting $dX(v)$ to be valued in $E_x.$ In order to respect the linear structure of a vector bundle, one imposes additional restrictions on how the direct sum decomposition of $T_{e}E$ moves as e is varied over a fiber.
3. (Covariant derivative) The standard derivative $dX(v)$ in Euclidean contexts satisfies certain dependencies on $X$ and $v,$ the most fundamental being linearity. A covariant derivative is defined to be any operation $(v,X)\mapsto\nabla_vX$ which mimics these properties, together with a form of the product rule.

Unless the base is zero-dimensional, there are always infinitely many connections which exist on a given differentiable vector bundle, and so there is always a corresponding choice of how to differentiate sections. Depending on context, there may be distinguished choices, for instance those which are determined by solving certain partial differential equations. In the case of the tangent bundle, any pseudo-Riemannian metric (and in particular any Riemannian metric) determines a canonical connection, called the Levi-Civita connection.

== Formal definition ==
Let $\pi: E\to M$ be a smooth real vector bundle over a smooth manifold $M$. Denote the space of smooth sections of $\pi: E\to M$ by $\Gamma(\pi )$. A covariant derivative on $\pi$ is either of the following equivalent structures:

1. an $\mathbb{R}$-linear map $\nabla : \Gamma(\pi) \to \Gamma(T^*M\otimes \pi )$ such that the product rule
  $$\nabla(fs) = df\otimes s + f\nabla s$$
  holds for all smooth functions $f$ on $M$ and all smooth sections $s$ of $\pi .$
2. an assignment, to any smooth section s and every $x\in M$, of an $\mathbb{R}$-linear map $(\nabla s)_x:T_xM\to \pi^{-1}(x)$ which depends smoothly on x and such that
  $$\nabla(a_1s_1+a_2s_2)=a_1\nabla s_1+a_2\nabla s_2$$
  for any two smooth sections $s_1,s_2$ and any real numbers $a_1,a_2,$ and such that for every smooth function $f$, $\nabla(fs)$ is related to $\nabla s$ by
  $$\big(\nabla(fs)\big)_x(v)=df(v)s(x)+f(x)(\nabla s)_x(v)$$
  for any $x\in M$ and $v\in T_xM.$

Beyond using the canonical identification between the vector space $T_x^\ast M\otimes \pi^{-1}(x)$ and the vector space of linear maps $T_xM\to \pi^{-1}(x),$ these two definitions are identical and differ only in the language used.

It is typical to denote $(\nabla s)_x(v)$ by $\nabla_vs,$ with $x$ being implicit in $v.$ With this notation, the product rule in the second version of the definition given above is written

$$\nabla_v(fs)=df(v)s+f\nabla_vs.$$

Remark. In the case of a complex vector bundle, the above definition is still meaningful, but is usually taken to be modified by changing "real" and "$\mathbb{R}$" everywhere they appear to "complex" and "$\mathbb{C}.$" This places extra restrictions, as not every real-linear map between complex vector spaces is complex-linear. There is some ambiguity in this distinction, as a complex vector bundle can also be regarded as a real vector bundle.

== Induced connections ==
Given a vector bundle $E\to M$, there are many associated bundles to $E$ which may be constructed, for example the dual vector bundle $E^*$, tensor powers $E^{\otimes k}$, symmetric and antisymmetric tensor powers $S^k E, \Lambda^k E$, and the direct sums $E^{\oplus k}$. A connection on $E$ induces a connection on any one of these associated bundles. The ease of passing between connections on associated bundles is more elegantly captured by the theory of principal bundle connections, but here we present some of the basic induced connections.

=== Dual connection ===
Given $\nabla$ a connection on $E$, the induced dual connection $\nabla^*$ on $E^*$ is defined implicitly by

$$d(\langle \xi, s \rangle)(X) = \langle \nabla_X^* \xi, s \rangle + \langle \xi, \nabla_X s \rangle.$$

Here $X\in \Gamma(TM)$ is a smooth vector field, $s\in \Gamma(E)$ is a section of $E$, and $\xi \in \Gamma(E^*)$ a section of the dual bundle, and $\langle \cdot , \cdot \rangle$ the natural pairing between a vector space and its dual (occurring on each fibre between $E$ and $E^*$), i.e., $\langle \xi , s \rangle:= \xi(s)$. Notice that this definition is essentially enforcing that $\nabla^*$ be the connection on $E^*$ so that a natural product rule is satisfied for pairing $\langle \cdot , \cdot \rangle$.

=== Tensor product connection ===
Given $\nabla^E, \nabla^F$ connections on two vector bundles $E, F\to M$, define the tensor product connection by the formula

$$(\nabla^E \otimes \nabla^F)_X(s\otimes t) = \nabla_X^E (s) \otimes t + s\otimes \nabla_X^F (t).$$

Here we have $s\in \Gamma(E), t\in \Gamma(F), X\in \Gamma(TM)$. Notice again this is the natural way of combining $\nabla^E, \nabla^F$ to enforce the product rule for the tensor product connection. By repeated application of the above construction applied to the tensor product $E^{\otimes k} = (E^{\otimes (k-1)}) \otimes E$, one also obtains the tensor power connection on $E^{\otimes k}$ for any $k\ge 1$ and vector bundle $E$.

=== Direct sum connection ===
The direct sum connection is defined by

$$(\nabla^E \oplus \nabla^F)_X (s\oplus t) = \nabla_X^E (s) \oplus \nabla_X^F (t),$$

where $s\oplus t\in \Gamma(E\oplus F)$.

=== Symmetric and exterior power connections ===
Since the symmetric power and exterior power of a vector bundle may be viewed naturally as subspaces of the tensor power, $S^k E, \Lambda^k E \subset E^{\otimes k}$, the definition of the tensor product connection applies in a straightforward manner to this setting. Indeed, since the symmetric and exterior algebras sit inside the tensor algebra as direct summands, and the connection $\nabla$ respects this natural splitting, one can simply restrict $\nabla$ to these summands. Explicitly, define the symmetric product connection by

$$\nabla^{\odot 2}_X(s\cdot t) = \nabla_X s \odot t + s \odot \nabla_X t$$

and the exterior product connection by

$$\nabla^{\wedge 2}_X (s\wedge t) = \nabla_X s \wedge t + s\wedge \nabla_X t$$

for all $s,t\in \Gamma(E), X\in \Gamma(TM)$. Repeated applications of these products gives induced symmetric power and exterior power connections on $S^k E$ and $\Lambda^k E$ respectively.

=== Endomorphism connection ===
Finally, one may define the induced connection $\nabla^{\operatorname{End}{E}}$ on the vector bundle of endomorphisms $\operatorname{End}(E) = E^* \otimes E$, the endomorphism connection. This is simply the tensor product connection of the dual connection $\nabla^*$ on $E^*$ and $\nabla$ on $E$. If $s\in \Gamma(E)$ and $u\in \Gamma(\operatorname{End}(E))$, so that the composition $u(s) \in \Gamma(E)$ also, then the following product rule holds for the endomorphism connection:

$$\nabla_X(u(s)) = \nabla_X^{\operatorname{End}(E)} (u) (s) + u(\nabla_X (s)).$$

By reversing this equation, it is possible to define the endomorphism connection as the unique connection satisfying

$$\nabla_X^{\operatorname{End}(E)} (u) (s) = \nabla_X(u(s)) - u(\nabla_X(s))$$

for any $u,s,X$, thus avoiding the need to first define the dual connection and tensor product connection.

=== Any associated bundle ===
Given a vector bundle $E$ of rank $r$, and any representation $\rho: \mathrm{GL}(r,\mathbb{K}) \to G$ into a linear group $G\subset \mathrm{GL}(V)$, there is an induced connection on the associated vector bundle $F = F(E)\times_\rho V$, where $F(E)$ is the principal $\mathrm{GL}(r,\mathbb K)$ bundle of frames of $E$. Each of the above examples can be seen as special cases of this construction: the dual bundle corresponds to the dual representation, the tensor product to the tensor product representation, the direct sum to the direct sum representation, and so on.

== Exterior covariant derivative and vector-valued forms ==
Let $E\to M$ be a vector bundle. An $E$-valued differential form of degree $r$ is a section of the tensor product bundle:

$$\bigwedge^rT^*M \otimes E.$$

The space of such forms is denoted by

$$\Omega^r(E) = \Omega^r(M;E) = \Gamma \left (\bigwedge^rT^*M  \otimes E \right ) = \Omega^r(M) \otimes_{C^{\infty}(M)} \Gamma(E),$$

where the last tensor product denotes the tensor product of modules over the ring of smooth functions on $M$.

An $E$-valued 0-form is just a section of the bundle $E$. That is,

$$\Omega^0(E) = \Gamma(E).$$

In this notation a connection on $E\to M$ is a linear map

$$\nabla:\Omega^0(E) \to \Omega^1(E).$$

A connection may then be viewed as a generalization of the exterior derivative to vector bundle valued forms. In fact, given a connection $\nabla$ on $E$ there is a unique way to extend $\nabla$ to an exterior covariant derivative

$$d_{\nabla}: \Omega^r(E) \to \Omega^{r+1}(E).$$

This exterior covariant derivative is defined by the following Leibniz rule, which is specified on simple tensors of the form $\omega\otimes s$ and extended linearly:

$$d_\nabla (\omega \otimes s) = d\omega \otimes s + (-1)^{\deg \omega} \omega \wedge \nabla s$$

where $\omega \in \Omega^r(M)$ so that $\deg \omega = r$, $s\in \Gamma(E)$ is a section, and $\omega \wedge \nabla s$ denotes the $(r+1)$-form with values in $E$ defined by wedging $\omega$ with the one-form part of $\nabla s$. Notice that for $E$-valued 0-forms, this recovers the normal Leibniz rule for the connection $\nabla$.

Unlike the ordinary exterior derivative, one generally has $d_{\nabla}^2 \ne 0$. In fact, $d_{\nabla}^2$ is directly related to the curvature of the connection $\nabla$ (see below).

== Affine properties of the set of connections ==
Every vector bundle over a manifold admits a connection, which can be proved using partitions of unity. However, connections are not unique. If $\nabla_1$ and $\nabla_2$ are two connections on $E\to M$ then their difference is a $C^{\infty}(M)$-linear operator. That is,

$$(\nabla_1 - \nabla_2)(fs) = f(\nabla_1s - \nabla_2s)$$

for all smooth functions $f$ on $M$ and all smooth sections $s$ of $E$. It follows that the difference $\nabla_1-\nabla_2$ can be uniquely identified with a one-form on $M$ with values in the endomorphism bundle $\operatorname{End}(E) = E^* \otimes E$:

$$\nabla_1 - \nabla_2 \in \Omega^1(M; \mathrm{End}\,E).$$

Conversely, if $\nabla$ is a connection on $E$ and $A$ is a one-form on $M$ with values in $\operatorname{End}(E)$, then $\nabla + A$ is a connection on $E$.

In other words, the space of connections on $E$ is an affine space for $\Omega^1(\operatorname{End}(E))$. This affine space is commonly denoted $\mathcal{A}$.

== Relation to principal and Ehresmann connections ==
Let $E\to M$ be a vector bundle of rank $k$ and let $\mathcal{F}(E)$ be the frame bundle of $E$. Then a (principal) connection on $\mathcal{F}(E)$ induces a connection on $E$. First note that sections of $E$ are in one-to-one correspondence with right-equivariant maps $\mathcal{F}(E)\to \mathbb{R}^k$. (This can be seen by considering the pullback of $E$ over $\mathcal{F}(E)\to M$, which is isomorphic to the trivial bundle $\mathcal{F}(E)\times \mathbb{R}^k$.) Given a section $s$ of $E$ let the corresponding equivariant map be $\psi(s)$. The covariant derivative on $E$ is then given by

$$\psi(\nabla_Xs) = X^H(\psi(s))$$

where $X^H$ is the horizontal lift of $X$ from $M$ to $\mathcal{F}(E)$. (Recall that the horizontal lift is determined by the connection on $\mathcal{F}(E)$.)

Conversely, a connection on $E$ determines a connection on $\mathcal{F}(E)$, and these two constructions are mutually inverse.

A connection on $E$ is also determined equivalently by a linear Ehresmann connection on $E$. This provides one method to construct the associated principal connection.

The induced connections discussed in #Induced connections can be constructed as connections on other associated bundles to the frame bundle of $E$, using representations other than the standard representation used above. For example if $\rho$ denotes the standard representation of $\operatorname{GL}(k,\mathbb{R})$ on $\mathbb{R}^k$, then the associated bundle to the representation $\rho \oplus \rho$ of $\operatorname{GL}(k,\mathbb{R})$ on $\mathbb{R}^k \oplus \mathbb{R}^k$ is the direct sum bundle $E\oplus E$, and the induced connection is precisely that which was described above.

== Local expression ==
Let $E\to M$ be a vector bundle of rank $k$, and let $U$ be an open subset of $M$ over which $E$ trivialises. Therefore over the set $U$, $E$ admits a local smooth frame of sections

$$\mathbf{e} = (e_1, \dots, e_k);\quad e_i: U \to \left.E\right|_U.$$

Since the frame $\mathbf{e}$ defines a basis of the fibre $E_x$ for any $x\in U$, one can expand any local section $s:U\to \left.E\right|_U$ in the frame as

$$s = \sum_{i=1}^k s^i e_i$$

for a collection of smooth functions $s^1, \dots, s^k: U \to \mathbb{R}$.

Given a connection $\nabla$ on $E$, it is possible to express $\nabla$ over $U$ in terms of the local frame of sections, by using the characteristic product rule for the connection. For any basis section $e_i$, the quantity $\nabla(e_i)\in \Omega^1(U) \otimes \Gamma(U,E)$ may be expanded in the local frame $\mathbf{e}$ as

$$\nabla (e_i) = \sum_{j=1}^k A_i^{\ j} \otimes e_j,$$

where $A_i^{\ j}\in \Omega^1(U);\, j=1,\dots,k$ are a collection of local one-forms. These forms can be put into a matrix of one-forms defined by

$$A = \begin{pmatrix} A_1^{\ 1} & \cdots & A_k^{\ 1} \\ \vdots & \ddots & \vdots \\ A_1^{\ k} & \cdots & A_k^{\ k} \end{pmatrix}\in \Omega^1(U, \operatorname{End}(\left.E\right|_U))$$

called the local connection form of $\nabla$ over $U$. The action of $\nabla$ on any section $s: U \to \left.E\right|_U$ can be computed in terms of $A$ using the product rule as

$$\nabla(s) = \sum_{j=1}^k \left(ds^j + \sum_{i=1}^k A_i^{\ j} s^i\right) \otimes e_j.$$

If the local section $s$ is also written in matrix notation as a column vector using the local frame $\mathbf{e}$ as a basis,

$$s = \begin{pmatrix} s^1 \\ \vdots \\ s^k\end{pmatrix},$$

then using regular matrix multiplication one can write

$$\nabla(s) = ds + As$$

where $ds$ is shorthand for applying the exterior derivative $d$ to each component of $s$ as a column vector. In this notation, one often writes locally that $\left.\nabla\right|_U = d+A$. In this sense a connection is locally completely specified by its connection one-form in some trivialisation.

As explained in #Affine properties of the set of connections, any connection differs from another by an endomorphism-valued one-form. From this perspective, the connection one-form $A$ is precisely the endomorphism-valued one-form such that the connection $\left.\nabla\right|_U$ on $\left.E\right|_U$ differs from the trivial connection $d$ on $\left.E\right|_U$, which exists because $U$ is a trivialising set for $E$.

=== Relationship to Christoffel symbols ===
In pseudo-Riemannian geometry, the Levi-Civita connection is often written in terms of the Christoffel symbols $\Gamma_{ij}^{\ \ k}$ instead of the connection one-form $A$. It is possible to define Christoffel symbols for a connection on any vector bundle, and not just the tangent bundle of a pseudo-Riemannian manifold. To do this, suppose that in addition to $U$ being a trivialising open subset for the vector bundle $E\to M$, that $U$ is also a local chart for the manifold $M$, admitting local coordinates $\mathbf{x} = (x^1,\dots,x^n);\quad x^i: U \to \mathbb{R}$.

In such a local chart, there is a distinguished local frame for the differential one-forms given by $(dx^1,\dots,dx^n)$, and the local connection one-forms $A_i^{ j}$ can be expanded in this basis as

$$A_i^{\ j} = \sum_{\ell=1}^n \Gamma_{\ell i}^{\ \ j} dx^\ell$$

for a collection of local smooth functions $\Gamma_{\ell i}^{\ \ j} : U \to \mathbb{R}$, called the Christoffel symbols of $\nabla$ over $U$. In the case where $E=TM$ and $\nabla$ is the Levi-Civita connection, these symbols agree precisely with the Christoffel symbols from pseudo-Riemannian geometry.

The expression for how $\nabla$ acts in local coordinates can be further expanded in terms of the local chart $U$ and the Christoffel symbols, to be given by

$$\nabla(s) = \sum_{i,j=1}^k \sum_{\ell=1}^n \left(\frac{\partial s^j}{\partial x^\ell} + \Gamma_{\ell i}^{\ \ j} s^i\right) dx^\ell \otimes e_j.$$

Contracting this expression with the local coordinate tangent vector $\frac{\partial}{\partial x^\ell}$ leads to

$$\nabla_{\frac{\partial}{\partial x^\ell}} (s) = \sum_{i,j=1}^k \left(\frac{\partial s^j}{\partial x^\ell} + \Gamma_{\ell i}^{\ \ j} s^i\right) e_j.$$

This defines a collection of $n$ locally defined operators

$$\nabla_\ell: \Gamma(U,E) \to \Gamma(U,E);\quad \nabla_\ell(s) := \sum_{i,j=1}^k \left(\frac{\partial s^j}{\partial x^\ell} + \Gamma_{\ell i}^{\ \ j} s^i\right)e_j,$$

with the property that

$$\nabla(s) = \sum_{\ell=1}^n dx^\ell \otimes \nabla_\ell(s).$$

=== Change of local trivialisation ===
Suppose $\mathbf{e'}$ is another choice of local frame over the same trivialising set $U$, so that there is a matrix $g=(g_i^{\ j})$ of smooth functions relating $\mathbf{e}$ and $\mathbf{e'}$, defined by

$$e_i = \sum_{j=1}^k g_i^{\ j} e'_j.$$

Tracing through the construction of the local connection form $A$ for the frame $\mathbf{e}$, one finds that the connection one-form $A'$ for $\mathbf{e'}$ is given by

$${A'}_i^{\ j} = \sum_{p,q=1}^k g_p^{\ j} A_q^{\ p} {(g^{-1})}_i^{\ q} - \sum_{p=1}^k (dg)_p^{\ j} {(g^{-1})}_i^{\ p}$$

where $g^{-1} = \left({(g^{-1})}_i^{\ j}\right)$ denotes the inverse matrix to $g$. In matrix notation this may be written

$$A' = g A g^{-1} - (dg)g^{-1}$$

where $dg$ is the matrix of one-forms given by taking the exterior derivative of the matrix $g$ component-by-component.

In the case where $E=TM$ is the tangent bundle and $g$ is the Jacobian of a coordinate transformation of $M$, the lengthy formulae for the transformation of the Christoffel symbols of the Levi-Civita connection can be recovered from the more succinct transformation laws of the connection form above.

== Parallel transport and holonomy ==
A connection $\nabla$ on a vector bundle $E\to M$ defines a notion of parallel transport on $E$ along a curve in $M$. Let $\gamma: [0,1]\to M$ be a smooth path in $M$. A section $s$ of $E$ along $\gamma$ is said to be parallel if

$$\nabla_{\dot\gamma(t)}s = 0$$

for all $t\in [0,1]$. Equivalently, one can consider the pullback bundle $\gamma^* E$ of $E$ by $\gamma$. This is a vector bundle over $[0,1]$ with fiber $E_{\gamma(t)}$ over $t\in [0,1]$. The connection $\nabla$ on $E$ pulls back to a connection on $\gamma^* E$. A section $s$ of $\gamma^* E$ is parallel if and only if $\gamma^* \nabla(s) = 0$.

Suppose $\gamma$ is a path from $x$ to $y$ in $M$. The above equation defining parallel sections is a first-order ordinary differential equation (cf. local expression above) and so has a unique solution for each possible initial condition. That is, for each vector $v$ in $E_x$ there exists a unique parallel section $s$ of $\gamma^* E$ with $s(0) = v$. Define a parallel transport map

$$\tau_\gamma : E_x \to E_y\,$$

by $\tau_\gamma(v) = s(1)$. It can be shown that $\tau_\gamma$ is a linear isomorphism, with inverse given by following the same procedure with the reversed path $\gamma^-$ from $y$ to $x$.

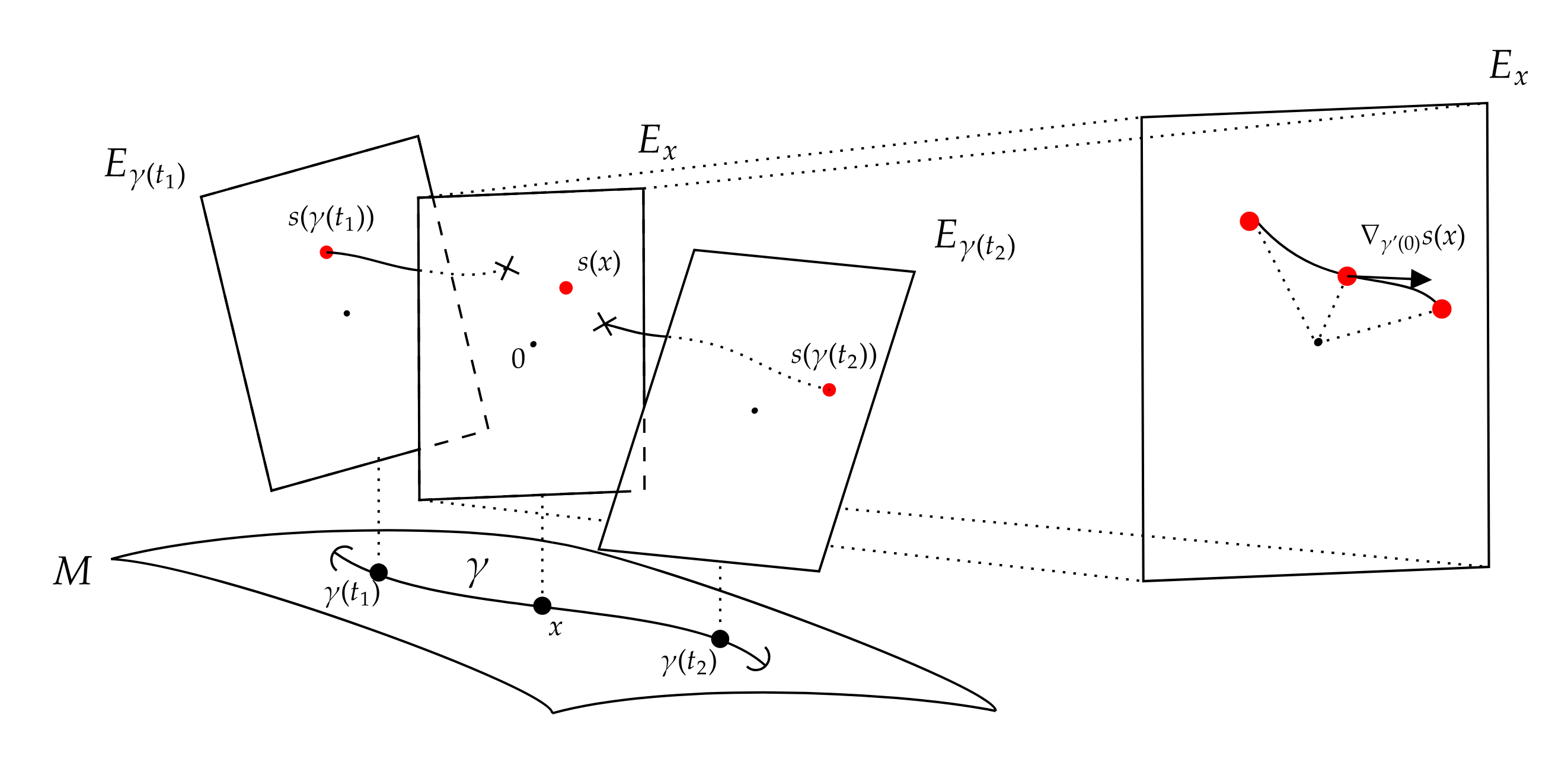
How to recover the covariant derivative of a connection from its parallel transport. The values $s(\gamma(t))$ of a section $s\in \Gamma(E)$ are parallel transported along the path $\gamma$ back to $\gamma(0)=x$, and then the covariant derivative is taken in the fixed vector space, the fibre $E_x$ over $x$.

Parallel transport can be used to define the holonomy group of the connection $\nabla$ based at a point $x$ in $M$. This is the subgroup of $\operatorname{GL}(E_x)$ consisting of all parallel transport maps coming from loops based at $x$:

$$\mathrm{Hol}_x = \{\tau_\gamma : \gamma \text{ is a loop based at } x\}.\,$$

The holonomy group of a connection is intimately related to the curvature of the connection (AmbroseSinger 1953).

The connection can be recovered from its parallel transport operators as follows. If $X\in \Gamma(TM)$ is a vector field and $s\in \Gamma(E)$ a section, at a point $x\in M$ pick an integral curve $\gamma: (-\varepsilon, \varepsilon) \to M$ for $X$ at $x$. For each $t\in (-\varepsilon, \varepsilon)$ we will write $\tau_t : E_{\gamma(t)} \to E_x$ for the parallel transport map traveling along $\gamma$ from $t$ to $0$. In particular for every $t\in (-\varepsilon, \varepsilon)$, we have $\tau_t s(\gamma(t)) \in E_x$. Then $t\mapsto \tau_t s(\gamma(t))$ defines a curve in the vector space $E_x$, which may be differentiated. The covariant derivative is recovered as

$$\nabla_X s(x) = \frac{d}{dt} \left( \tau_t s(\gamma(t)) \right)_{t=0}.$$

This demonstrates that an equivalent definition of a connection is given by specifying all the parallel transport isomorphisms $\tau_{\gamma}$ between fibres of $E$ and taking the above expression as the definition of $\nabla$.

== Curvature ==
The curvature of a connection $\nabla$ on $E\to M$ is a 2-form $F_{\nabla}$ on $M$ with values in the endomorphism bundle $\operatorname{End}(E) = E^* \otimes E$. That is,

$$F_\nabla \in \Omega^2(\mathrm{End}(E)) = \Gamma(\Lambda^2T^*M \otimes \mathrm{End}(E)).$$

It is defined by the expression

$$F_\nabla(X,Y)(s) = \nabla_X\nabla_Y s- \nabla_Y\nabla_X s- \nabla_{[X,Y]}s$$

where $X$ and $Y$ are tangent vector fields on $M$ and $s$ is a section of $E$. One must check that $F_{\nabla}$ is $C^{\infty}(M)$-linear in both $X$ and $Y$ and that it does in fact define a bundle endomorphism of $E$.

As mentioned above, the covariant exterior derivative $d_{\nabla}$ need not square to zero when acting on $E$-valued forms. The operator $d_{\nabla}^2$ is, however, strictly tensorial (i.e. $C^{\infty}(M)$-linear). This implies that it is induced from a 2-form with values in $\operatorname{End}(E)$. This 2-form is precisely the curvature form given above. For an $E$-valued form $\sigma$ we have

$$(d_\nabla)^2\sigma = F_\nabla\wedge\sigma.$$

A flat connection is one whose curvature form vanishes identically.

=== Local form and Cartan's structure equation ===
The curvature form has a local description called Cartan's structure equation. If $\nabla$ has local form $A$ on some trivialising open subset $U\subset M$ for $E$, then

$$F_{\nabla} = dA + A \wedge A$$

on $U$. To clarify this notation, notice that $A$ is a endomorphism-valued one-form, and so in local coordinates takes the form of a matrix of one-forms. The operation $d$ applies the exterior derivative component-wise to this matrix, and $A\wedge A$ denotes matrix multiplication, where the components are wedged rather than multiplied.

In local coordinates $\mathbf{x} = (x^1,\dots,x^n)$ on $M$ over $U$, if the connection form is written $A=A_\ell dx^\ell = (\Gamma_{\ell i}^{\ \ j}) dx^\ell$ for a collection of local endomorphisms $A_\ell = (\Gamma_{\ell i}^{\ \ j})$, then one has

$$F_{\nabla} = \sum_{p,q=1}^n \frac{1}{2} \left( \frac{\partial A_q}{\partial x^p} - \frac{\partial A_p}{\partial x^q} + [A_p, A_q]\right) dx^p \wedge dx^q.$$

Further expanding this in terms of the Christoffel symbols $\Gamma_{\ell i}^{\ \ j}$ produces the familiar expression from Riemannian geometry. Namely if $s=s^i e_i$ is a section of $E$ over $U$, then

$$F_{\nabla}(s) = \sum_{i,j=1}^k \sum_{p,q=1}^n \frac{1}{2} \left( \frac{\partial \Gamma_{qi}^{\ \ j}}{\partial x^p} - \frac{\partial \Gamma_{pi}^{\ \ j}}{\partial x^q} + \Gamma_{pr}^{\ \ j} \Gamma_{qi}^{\ \ r} - \Gamma_{qr}^{\ \ j} \Gamma_{pi}^{\ \ r} \right) s^i dx^p \wedge dx^q \otimes e_j = \sum_{i,j=1}^k \sum_{p,q=1}^n R_{pqi}^{\ \ \ j} s^i dx^p\wedge dx^q \otimes e_j.$$

Here $R=(R_{pqi}^{\ \ \ j})$ is the full curvature tensor of $F_{\nabla}$, and in Riemannian geometry would be identified with the Riemannian curvature tensor.

It can be checked that if we define $[A, A]$ to be wedge product of forms but commutator of endomorphisms as opposed to composition, then $A \wedge A = \frac{1}{2} [A, A]$, and with this alternate notation the Cartan structure equation takes the form

$$F_{\nabla} = dA + \frac{1}{2} [A, A].$$

This alternate notation is commonly used in the theory of principal bundle connections, where instead we use a connection form $\omega$, a Lie algebra-valued one-form, for which there is no notion of composition (unlike in the case of endomorphisms), but there is a notion of a Lie bracket.

In some references (see for example (MadsenTornehave1997)) the Cartan structure equation may be written with a minus sign:

$$F_{\nabla} = dA - A \wedge A.$$

This different convention uses an order of matrix multiplication that is different from the standard Einstein notation in the wedge product of matrix-valued one-forms.

=== Bianchi identity ===
A version of the second (differential) Bianchi identity from Riemannian geometry holds for a connection on any vector bundle. Recall that a connection $\nabla$ on a vector bundle $E\to M$ induces an endomorphism connection on $\operatorname{End}(E)$. This endomorphism connection has itself an exterior covariant derivative, which we ambiguously call $d_{\nabla}$. Since the curvature is a globally defined $\operatorname{End}(E)$-valued two-form, we may apply the exterior covariant derivative to it. The Bianchi identity says that

$$d_{\nabla} F_{\nabla} = 0$$.

This succinctly captures the complicated tensor formulae of the Bianchi identity in the case of Riemannian manifolds, and one may translate from this equation to the standard Bianchi identities by expanding the connection and curvature in local coordinates.

There is no analogue in general of the first (algebraic) Bianchi identity for a general connection, as this exploits the special symmetries of the Levi-Civita connection. Namely, one exploits that the vector bundle indices of $E=TM$ in the curvature tensor $R$ may be swapped with the cotangent bundle indices coming from $T^*M$ after using the metric to lower or raise indices. For example this allows the torsion-freeness condition $\Gamma_{\ell i}^{\ \ j} = \Gamma_{i \ell}^{\ \ j}$ to be defined for the Levi-Civita connection, but for a general vector bundle the $\ell$-index refers to the local coordinate basis of $T^*M$, and the $i,j$-indices to the local coordinate frame of $E$ and $E^*$ coming from the splitting $\mathrm{End}(E)=E^* \otimes E$. However in special circumstance, for example when the rank of $E$ equals the dimension of $M$ and a solder form has been chosen, one can use the soldering to interchange the indices and define a notion of torsion for affine connections which are not the Levi-Civita connection.

== Gauge transformations ==
Given two connections $\nabla_1, \nabla_2$ on a vector bundle $E\to M$, it is natural to ask when they might be considered equivalent. There is a well-defined notion of an automorphism of a vector bundle $E\to M$. A section $u\in \Gamma(\operatorname{End}(E))$ is an automorphism if $u(x)\in \operatorname{End}(E_x)$ is invertible at every point $x\in M$. Such an automorphism is called a gauge transformation of $E$, and the group of all automorphisms is called the gauge group, often denoted $\mathcal{G}$ or $\operatorname{Aut}(E)$. The group of gauge transformations may be neatly characterised as the space of sections of the capital A adjoint bundle $\operatorname{Ad}(\mathcal{F}(E))$ of the frame bundle of the vector bundle $E$. This is not to be confused with the lowercase a adjoint bundle $\operatorname{ad}(\mathcal{F}(E))$, which is naturally identified with $\operatorname{End}(E)$ itself. The bundle $\operatorname{Ad} \mathcal{F}(E)$ is the associated bundle to the principal frame bundle by the conjugation representation of $G=\operatorname{GL}(r)$ on itself, $g\mapsto ghg^{-1}$, and has fibre the same general linear group $\operatorname{GL}(r)$ where $\operatorname{rank} (E) = r$. Notice that despite having the same fibre as the frame bundle $\mathcal{F}(E)$ and being associated to it, $\operatorname{Ad}(\mathcal{F}(E))$ is not equal to the frame bundle, nor even a principal bundle itself. The gauge group may be equivalently characterised as $\mathcal{G} = \Gamma(\operatorname{Ad} \mathcal{F}(E)).$

A gauge transformation $u$ of $E$ acts on sections $s\in \Gamma(E)$, and therefore acts on connections by conjugation. Explicitly, if $\nabla$ is a connection on $E$, then one defines $u\cdot \nabla$ by

$$(u\cdot \nabla)_X(s) = u(\nabla_X (u^{-1}(s))$$

for $s\in \Gamma(E), X\in \Gamma(TM)$. To check that $u\cdot \nabla$ is a connection, one verifies the product rule

$$\begin{align} u\cdot \nabla(fs) &= u(\nabla(u^{-1}(fs)))\\&=u(\nabla(fu^{-1}(s)))\\&=u(df \otimes u^{-1}(s)) + u(f\nabla(u^{-1}(s)))\\&=df \otimes s + f u\cdot \nabla(s).\end{align}$$

It may be checked that this defines a left group action of $\mathcal{G}$ on the affine space of all connections $\mathcal{A}$.

Since $\mathcal{A}$ is an affine space modelled on $\Omega^1(M, \operatorname{End}(E))$, there should exist some endomorphism-valued one-form $A_u\in \Omega^1(M, \operatorname{End}(E))$ such that $u\cdot \nabla = \nabla + A_u$. Using the definition of the endomorphism connection $\nabla^{\operatorname{End}(E)}$ induced by $\nabla$, it can be seen that

$$u\cdot \nabla = \nabla - d^{\nabla}(u) u^{-1}$$

which is to say that $A_u = - d^{\nabla}(u) u^{-1}$.

Two connections are said to be gauge equivalent if they differ by the action of the gauge group, and the quotient space $\mathcal{B} = \mathcal{A}/\mathcal{G}$ is the moduli space of all connections on $E$. In general this topological space is neither a smooth manifold or even a Hausdorff space, but contains inside it the moduli space of Yang–Mills connections on $E$, which is of significant interest in gauge theory and physics.

== Examples ==
- A classical covariant derivative or affine connection defines a connection on the tangent bundle of M, or more generally on any tensor bundle formed by taking tensor products of the tangent bundle with itself and its dual.
- A connection on $\pi: \R^2\times \R \to \R$ can be described explicitly as the operator

$$\nabla = d + \begin{bmatrix} f_{11}(x) & f_{12}(x) \\ f_{21}(x) & f_{22}(x) \end{bmatrix}dx$$

where $d$ is the exterior derivative evaluated on vector-valued smooth functions and $f_{ij}(x)$ are smooth. A section $a \in \Gamma(\pi)$ may be identified with a map

$$\begin{cases} \R \to \R^2 \\ x \mapsto (a_1(x),a_2(x)) \end{cases}$$

and then

$$\nabla(a)= \nabla \begin{bmatrix} a_1(x) \\ a_2(x) \end{bmatrix} = \begin{bmatrix} \frac{da_1(x)}{dx} + f_{11}(x)a_1(x) + f_{12}(x)a_2(x) \\ \frac{da_2(x)}{dx} + f_{21}(x)a_1(x) + f_{22}(x)a_2(x)\end{bmatrix}dx$$

- If the bundle is endowed with a bundle metric, an inner product on its vector space fibers, a metric connection is defined as a connection that is compatible with the bundle metric.
- A Yang-Mills connection is a special metric connection which satisfies the Yang-Mills equations of motion.
- A Riemannian connection is a metric connection on the tangent bundle of a Riemannian manifold.
- A Levi-Civita connection is a special Riemannian connection: the metric-compatible connection on the tangent bundle that is also torsion-free. It is unique, in the sense that given any Riemannian connection, one can always find one and only one equivalent connection that is torsion-free. "Equivalent" means it is compatible with the same metric, although the curvature tensors may be different; see teleparallelism. The difference between a Riemannian connection and the corresponding Levi-Civita connection is given by the contorsion tensor.
- The exterior derivative is a flat connection on $E=M \times \R$ (the trivial line bundle over M).
- More generally, there is a canonical flat connection on any flat vector bundle (i.e. a vector bundle whose transition functions are all constant) which is given by the exterior derivative in any trivialization.

== See also ==
- D-module
- Connection (mathematics)
