= Metric connection =

Construct in differenital geometry

In mathematics, a metric connection is a connection in a vector bundle E equipped with a bundle metric; that is, a metric for which the inner product of any two vectors will remain the same when those vectors are parallel transported along any curve. This is equivalent to:

- A connection for which the covariant derivatives of the metric on E vanish.
- A principal connection on the bundle of orthonormal frames of E.

A special case of a metric connection is a Riemannian connection; there exists a unique such connection which is torsion free, the Levi-Civita connection. In this case, the bundle E is the tangent bundle TM of a manifold, and the metric on E is induced by a Riemannian metric on M.

Another special case of a metric connection is a Yang–Mills connection, which satisfies the Yang–Mills equations of motion. Most of the machinery of defining a connection and its curvature can be worked through without requiring any compatibility with the bundle metric. However, once one does require compatibility, this metric connection defines an inner product, Hodge star (which additionally needs a choice of orientation), and Laplacian, which are required to formulate the Yang–Mills equations.

== Definition ==
Let $\sigma,\tau$ be any local sections of the vector bundle E, and let X be a vector field on the base space M of the bundle. Let $\langle\cdot ,\cdot\rangle$ define a bundle metric, that is, a metric on the vector fibers of E. Then, a connection D on E is a metric connection if:

$$d \langle \sigma,\tau\rangle = \langle D\sigma,\tau\rangle + \langle \sigma,D \tau\rangle.$$

Here d is the ordinary differential of a scalar function. The covariant derivative can be extended so that it acts as a map on E-valued differential forms on the base space:

$$D: \Gamma(E)\otimes \Omega^p(M)\to \Gamma(E)\otimes \Omega^{p+1}(M).$$

One defines $D_X f = d_X f \equiv Xf$ for a function $f\in \Omega^0(M)$, and

$$D(\sigma\otimes\omega)= D\sigma\wedge\omega + \sigma\otimes d\omega$$

where $\sigma\in\Gamma(E)$ is a local smooth section for the vector bundle and $\omega\in \Omega^p(M)$ is a (scalar-valued) p-form. The above definitions also apply to local smooth frames as well as local sections.

=== Metric versus dual pairing ===
The bundle metric $\langle\cdot ,\cdot\rangle$ imposed on E should not be confused with the natural pairing $(\cdot ,\cdot)$ of a vector space and its dual, which is intrinsic to any vector bundle. The latter is a function on the bundle of endomorphisms $\mbox{End} (E) = E\otimes E^*,$ so that
$$(\cdot ,\cdot):E\otimes E^* \to M\times\mathbb{R}$$

pairs vectors with dual vectors (functionals) above each point of M. That is, if $\{e_i\}$ is any local coordinate frame on E, then one naturally obtains a dual coordinate frame $\{e^*_i\}$ on E* satisfying $(e_i ,e^*_j)=\delta_{ij}$.

By contrast, the bundle metric $\langle\cdot ,\cdot\rangle$ is a function on $E\otimes E,$

$$\langle\cdot ,\cdot\rangle:E\otimes E \to M\times \mathbb{R}$$

giving an inner product on each vector space fiber of E. The bundle metric allows one to define an orthonormal coordinate frame by the equation $\langle e_i ,e_j\rangle=\delta_{ij}.$

Given a vector bundle, it is always possible to define a bundle metric on it.

Following standard practice, one can define a connection form, the Christoffel symbols and the Riemann curvature without reference to the bundle metric, using only the pairing $(\cdot ,\cdot).$ They will obey the usual symmetry properties; for example, the curvature tensor will be anti-symmetric in the last two indices and will satisfy the second Bianchi identity. However, to define the Hodge star, the Laplacian, the first Bianchi identity, and the Yang–Mills functional, one needs the bundle metric. The Hodge star additionally needs a choice of orientation, and produces the Hodge dual of its argument.

== Connection form ==
Given a local bundle chart, the covariant derivative can be written in the form

$$D = d + A$$
where A is the connection one-form.

A bit of notational machinery is in order. Let $\Gamma(E)$ denote the space of differentiable sections on E, let $\Omega^p(M)$ denote the space of p-forms on M, and let $\mbox{End}(E)=E\otimes E^*$ be the endomorphisms on E. The covariant derivative, as defined here, is a map
$$D: \Gamma(E) \to \Gamma(E)\otimes \Omega^1(M)$$

One may express the connection form in terms of the connection coefficients as

$$A_j{}^{k} \ =\ \Gamma^k{}_{ij}\, dx^i.$$

The point of the notation is to distinguish the indices j, k, which run over the n dimensions of the fiber, from the index i, which runs over the m-dimensional base space. For the case of a Riemann connection below, the vector space E is taken to be the tangent bundle TM, and n = m.

The notation of A for the connection form comes from physics, in historical reference to the vector potential field of electromagnetism and gauge theory. In mathematics, the notation $\omega$ is often used in place of A, as in the article on the connection form; unfortunately, the use of $\omega$ for the connection form collides with the use of $\omega$ to denote a generic alternating form on the vector bundle.

=== Skew symmetry ===
The connection is skew-symmetric in the vector-space (fiber) indices; that is, for a given vector field $X\in TM$, the matrix $A(X)$ is skew-symmetric; equivalently, it is an element of the Lie algebra $\mathfrak{o}(n)$.

This can be seen as follows. Let the fiber be n-dimensional, so that the bundle E can be given an orthonormal local frame $\{e_i\}$ with i = 1, 2, ..., n. One then has, by definition, that $de_i \equiv 0$, so that:

$$De_i = Ae_i = A_i{}^{j} e_j.$$

In addition, for each point $x\in U\subset M$ of the bundle chart, the local frame is orthonormal:

$$\langle e_i(x), e_j(x)\rangle = \delta_{ij}.$$

It follows that, for every vector $X\in T_xM$, that

$$\begin{align}
0 &= X \langle e_i(x), e_j(x)\rangle \\
&= \langle A(X) e_i(x), e_j(x)\rangle + \langle e_i(x), A(X) e_j(x)\rangle \\
&= A_i{}^{j}(X) + A_j{}^{i}(X) \\
\end{align}$$

That is, $A=-A^\text{T}$ is skew-symmetric.

This is arrived at by explicitly using the bundle metric; without making use of this, and using only the pairing $(\cdot,\cdot)$, one can only relate the connection form A on E to its dual A^{∗} on E^{∗}, as $A^*=-A^\text{T}.$ This follows from the definition of the dual connection as $d(\sigma,\tau^*)=(D\sigma,\tau^*)+(\sigma,D^*\tau^*).$

== Curvature ==
There are several notations in use for the curvature of a connection, including a modern one using F to denote the field strength tensor, a classical one using R as the curvature tensor, and the classical notation for the Riemann curvature tensor, most of which can be extended naturally to the case of vector bundles. None of these definitions require either a metric tensor, or a bundle metric, and can be defined quite concretely without reference to these. The definitions do, however, require a clear idea of the endomorphisms of E, as described above.

=== Compact style ===
The most compact definition of the curvature F is to define it as the 2-form taking values in $\mbox{End}(E)$, given by the amount by which the connection fails to be exact; that is, as
$$F=D\circ D$$
which is an element of
$$F\in \Omega^2(M)\otimes \mbox{End}(E),$$
or equivalently,
$$F:\Gamma(E) \to \Gamma(E)\otimes \Omega^2(M)$$
To relate this to other common definitions and notations, let $\sigma\in\Gamma(E)$ be a section on E. Inserting into the above and expanding, one finds
$$F\sigma = (D\circ D)\sigma = (d+A)\circ(d+A)\sigma = (dA+A\wedge A)\sigma$$

or equivalently, dropping the section
$$F = dA+A\wedge A$$
as a terse definition.

=== Component style ===
In terms of components, let $A=A_idx^i,$ where $dx^i$ is the standard one-form coordinate bases on the cotangent bundle T^{*}M. Inserting into the above, and expanding, one obtains (using the summation convention):
$$F=\frac{1}{2}\left(
\frac{\partial A_j}{\partial x^i} - \frac{\partial A_i}{\partial x^j} +[A_i,A_j]
\right) dx^i\wedge dx^j.$$

Keep in mind that for an n-dimensional vector space, each $A_i$ is an n×n matrix, the indices of which have been suppressed, whereas the indices i and j run over 1,...,m, with m being the dimension of the underlying manifold. Both of these indices can be made simultaneously manifest, as shown in the next section.

The notation presented here is that which is commonly used in physics; for example, it can be immediately recognizable as the gluon field strength tensor. For the abelian case, n=1, and the vector bundle is one-dimensional; the commutator vanishes, and the above can then be recognized as the electromagnetic tensor in more or less standard physics notation.

=== Relativity style ===
All of the indices can be made explicit by providing a smooth frame $\{e_i\}$, i = 1, ..., n on $\Gamma(E)$. A given section $\sigma \in \Gamma(E)$ then may be written as

$$\sigma=\sigma^i e_i$$

In this local frame, the connection form becomes
$$(A_i dx^i)_j{}^{k} = \Gamma^k{}_{ij} dx^i$$
with $\Gamma^k{}_{ij}$ being the Christoffel symbol; again, the index i runs over 1, ..., m (the dimension of the underlying manifold M) while j and k run over 1, ..., n, the dimension of the fiber. Inserting and turning the crank, one obtains
$$\begin{align}
F\sigma
&= \frac{1}{2}\left(
\frac{\partial\Gamma^k{}_{jr}}{\partial x^i} - \frac{\partial\Gamma^k{}_{ir}}{\partial x^j}
+ \Gamma^k{}_{is}\Gamma^s{}_{jr} - \Gamma^k{}_{js}\Gamma^s{}_{ir}
\right) \sigma^r dx^i\wedge dx^j \otimes e_k  \\
&= R^k{}_{rij} \sigma^r dx^i\wedge dx^j \otimes e_k  \\
\end{align}$$

where $R^k{}_{rij}$ now identifiable as the Riemann curvature tensor. This is written in the style commonly employed in many textbooks on general relativity from the middle-20th century (with several notable exceptions, such as MTW, that pushed early on for an index-free notation). Again, the indices i and j run over the dimensions of the manifold M, while r and k run over the dimension of the fibers.

=== Tangent-bundle style ===
The above can be back-ported to the vector-field style, by writing $\partial/\partial x^i$ as the standard basis elements for the tangent bundle TM. One then defines the curvature tensor as
$$R\left(\frac{\partial}{\partial x^i}, \frac{\partial}{\partial x^j}\right) \sigma
= \sigma^r R^k_{\;rij} e_k$$

so that the spatial directions are re-absorbed, resulting in the notation

$$F\sigma = R(\cdot,\cdot)\sigma$$

Alternately, the spatial directions can be made manifest, while hiding the indices, by writing the expressions in terms of vector fields X and Y on TM. In the standard basis, X is
$$X=X^i\frac{\partial}{\partial x^i}$$
and likewise for Y. After a bit of plug and chug, one obtains
$$R(X,Y)\sigma = D_X D_Y\sigma - D_Y D_X\sigma - D_{[X,Y]}\sigma$$
where
$$[X,Y]=\mathcal{L}_XY$$
is the Lie derivative of the vector field Y with respect to X.

To recap, the curvature tensor maps fibers to fibers:
$$R(X,Y) : \Gamma(E)\to\Gamma(E)$$
so that
$$R(\cdot,\cdot): \Omega^2(M) \otimes \Gamma(E)\to\Gamma(E)$$

To be very clear, $F=R(\cdot,\cdot)$ are alternative notations for the same thing. Observe that none of the above manipulations ever actually required the bundle metric to go through. One can also demonstrate the second Bianchi identity
$$DF=0$$
without having to make any use of the bundle metric.

== Yang–Mills connection ==
The above development of the curvature tensor did not make any appeals to the bundle metric. That is, they did not need to assume that D or A were metric connections: simply having a connection on a vector bundle is sufficient to obtain the above forms. All of the different notational variants follow directly only from consideration of the endomorphisms of the fibers of the bundle.

The bundle metric is required to define the Hodge star and the Hodge dual; that is needed, in turn, to define the Laplacian, and to demonstrate that
$$D{\star}F=0$$

Any connection that satisfies this identity is referred to as a Yang–Mills connection. It can be shown that this connection is a critical point of the Euler–Lagrange equations applied to the Yang–Mills action

$$YM_D = \int_M (F,F) {\star}(1)$$

where ${\star}(1)$ is the volume element, the Hodge dual of the constant 1. Note that three different inner products are required to construct this action: the metric connection on E, an inner product on End(E), equivalent to the quadratic Casimir operator (the trace of a pair of matrices), and the Hodge dual.

== Riemannian connection ==
An important special case of a metric connection is a Riemannian connection. This is a connection $\nabla$ on the tangent bundle of a pseudo-Riemannian manifold (M, g) such that $\nabla_X g = 0$ for all vector fields X on M. Equivalently, $\nabla$ is Riemannian if the parallel transport it defines preserves the metric g.

A given connection $\nabla$ is Riemannian if and only if

$$\partial_X(g(Y,Z))=g(\nabla_XY,Z)+g(Y,\nabla_XZ)$$

for all vector fields X, Y and Z on M, where $\partial_X(g(Y,Z))$ denotes the derivative of the function $g(Y,Z)$ along this vector field $X$.

The Levi-Civita connection is the torsion-free Riemannian connection on a manifold. It is unique by the fundamental theorem of Riemannian geometry. For every Riemannian connection, one may write a (unique) corresponding Levi-Civita connection. The difference between the two is given by the contorsion tensor.

In component notation, the covariant derivative $\nabla$ is compatible with the metric tensor $g_{ab}$ if

$$\nabla_{\!c} \, g_{ab} = 0.$$

Although other covariant derivatives may be defined, usually one only considers the metric-compatible one. This is because given two covariant derivatives, $\nabla$ and $\nabla'$, there exists a tensor for transforming from one to the other:

$$\nabla_a x_b = \nabla_a' x_b - {C_{ab}}^c x_c.$$

If the space is also torsion-free, then the tensor ${C_{ab}}^c$ is symmetric in its first two indices.

=== A word about notation ===
It is conventional to change notation and use the nabla symbol ∇ in place of D in this setting; in other respects, these two are the same thing. That is, ∇ = D from the previous sections above.

Likewise, the inner product $\langle\cdot,\cdot\rangle$ on E is replaced by the metric tensor g on TM. This is consistent with historic usage, but also avoids confusion: for the general case of a vector bundle E, the underlying manifold M is not assumed to be endowed with a metric. The special case of manifolds with both a metric g on TM in addition to a bundle metric $\langle\cdot,\cdot\rangle$ on E leads to Kaluza–Klein theory.

== See also ==
- Vertical and horizontal bundles
