= Bundle metric =

In differential geometry, the notion of a metric tensor can be extended to an arbitrary vector bundle, and to some principal fiber bundles. This metric is often called a bundle metric, or fibre metric.

== Definition ==
If M is a topological manifold and π : E → M a vector bundle on M, then a metric on E is a bundle map k : E ×_{M} E → M × R from the fiber product of E with itself to the trivial bundle with fiber R such that the restriction of k to each fibre over M is a nondegenerate bilinear map of vector spaces. Roughly speaking, k gives a kind of dot product (not necessarily symmetric or positive definite) on the vector space above each point of M, and these products vary smoothly over M.

== Properties ==
Every vector bundle with paracompact base space can be equipped with a bundle metric. For a vector bundle of rank n, this follows from the bundle charts $\phi:\pi^{-1}(U)\to U\times\mathbb{R}^n$: the bundle metric can be taken as the pullback of the inner product of a metric on $\mathbb{R}^n$; for example, the orthonormal charts of Euclidean space. The structure group of such a metric is the orthogonal group O(n).

== Example: Riemann metric ==
If M is a Riemannian manifold, and E is its tangent bundle TM, then the Riemannian metric gives a bundle metric, and vice versa.

== Example: on vertical bundles ==
If the bundle π:P → M is a principal fiber bundle with group G, and G is a compact Lie group, then there exists an Ad(G)-invariant inner product k on the fibers, taken from the inner product on the corresponding compact Lie algebra. More precisely, there is a metric tensor k defined on the vertical bundle E = VP such that k is invariant under left-multiplication:

$$k(L_{g*}X, L_{g*}Y)=k(X,Y)$$

for vertical vectors X, Y and L_{g} is left-multiplication by g along the fiber, and L_{g*} is the pushforward. That is, E is the vector bundle that consists of the vertical subspace of the tangent of the principal bundle.

More generally, whenever one has a compact group with Haar measure μ, and an arbitrary inner product h(X,Y) defined at the tangent space of some point in G, one can define an invariant metric simply by averaging over the entire group, i.e. by defining

$$k(X,Y)=\int_G h(L_{g*} X, L_{g*} Y) d\mu_g$$

as the average.

The above notion can be extended to the associated bundle $P\times_G V$ where V is a vector space transforming covariantly under some representation of G.

== In relation to Kaluza–Klein theory ==
If the base space M is also a metric space, with metric g, and the principal bundle is endowed with a connection form ω, then π^{*}g+kω is a metric defined on the entire tangent bundle E = TP.

More precisely, one writes π^{*}g(X,Y) = g(π_{*}X, π_{*}Y) where π_{*} is the pushforward of the projection π, and g is the metric tensor on the base space M. The expression kω should be understood as (kω)(X,Y) = k(ω(X),ω(Y)), with k the metric tensor on each fiber. Here, X and Y are elements of the tangent space TP.

Observe that the lift π^{*}g vanishes on the vertical subspace TV (since π_{*} vanishes on vertical vectors), while kω vanishes on the horizontal subspace TH (since the horizontal subspace is defined as that part of the tangent space TP on which the connection ω vanishes). Since the total tangent space of the bundle is a direct sum of the vertical and horizontal subspaces (that is, TP = TV ⊕ TH), this metric is well-defined on the entire bundle.

This bundle metric underpins the generalized form of Kaluza–Klein theory due to several interesting properties that it possesses. The scalar curvature derived from this metric is constant on each fiber, this follows from the Ad(G) invariance of the fiber metric k. The scalar curvature on the bundle can be decomposed into three distinct pieces:

R_{E} = R_{M}(g) + L(g, ω) + R_{G}(k)

where R_{E} is the scalar curvature on the bundle as a whole (obtained from the metric π^{*}g+kω above), and R_{M}(g) is the scalar curvature on the base manifold M (the Lagrangian density of the Einstein–Hilbert action), and L(g, ω) is the Lagrangian density for the Yang–Mills action, and R_{G}(k) is the scalar curvature on each fibre (obtained from the fiber metric k, and constant, due to the Ad(G)-invariance of the metric k). The arguments denote that R_{M}(g) only depends on the metric g on the base manifold, but not ω or k, and likewise, that R_{G}(k) only depends on k, and not on g or ω, and so-on.
