= Carlos Kenig =

Argentine American mathematician

Carlos E. Kenig
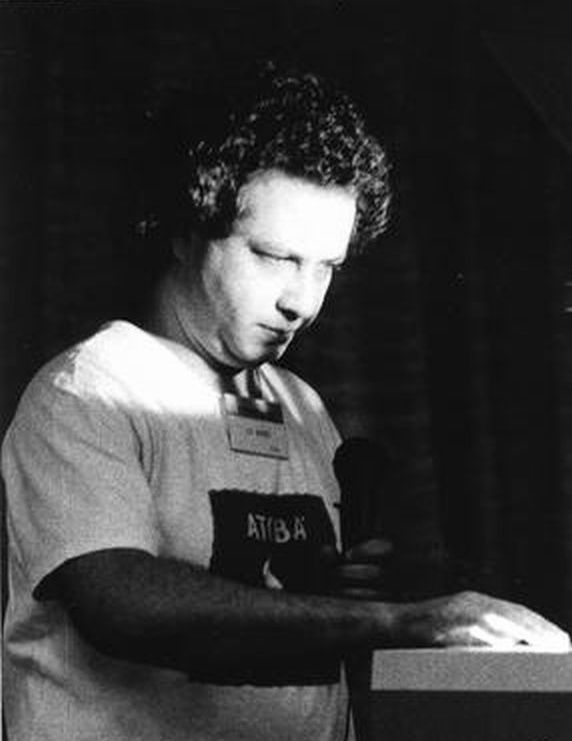
- Born: November 25, 1953 (age 72); Buenos Aires, Argentina
- Education: University of Chicago
- Scientific career
- Fields: Mathematics
- Workplaces: University of Chicago
- Thesis: H^{p} spaces on Lipschitz domains (1978)
- Doctoral advisor: Alberto Calderón
- Doctoral students: Donatella Danielli; Panagiota Daskalopoulos; Irina Mitrea; Zhongwei Shen; Gigliola Staffilani

Carlos Eduardo Kenig (born November 25, 1953) is an Argentine-American mathematician and Louis Block Distinguished Service Professor in the Department of Mathematics at the University of Chicago. He is known for his work in harmonic analysis and partial differential equations. He was President of the International Mathematical Union between 2019 and 2022.

== Career ==
Kenig obtained his PhD at the University of Chicago in 1978 under the supervision of Alberto Calderón. Since then, he has held positions at Princeton University and the University of Minnesota before returning to the University of Chicago in 1985. He has done extensive work in elliptic and dispersive partial differential equations. He is a member of the National Academy of Sciences since 2014. His students include Zhongwei Shen, Kin Ming Hui, Gigliola Staffilani and Panagiota Daskalopoulos.

== Awards and honors ==
- 1984 - Salem Prize
- 1986 - Invited speaker International Congress of Mathematicians (and 2002)
- 2002 - Elected Fellow of the American Academy of Arts and Sciences
- 2008 - Bôcher Memorial Prize
- 2010 - Plenary speaker, 2010 International Congress of Mathematicians
- 2014 - Elected Member of the National Academy of Sciences
- 2024 - ICMAM Prize Awarded by the research organization ICMAM Latin America.
- 2026 - King Faisal Prize in the category of "Science".

Kenig was elected President of the International Mathematical Union in July 2018, a position that he holds until 2022.
