= Donatella Danielli =

Professor of mathematics

- Born: 1966
- Education: University of Bologna
- Awards: National Science Foundation CAREER Awards (2003) Fellow of the American Mathematical Society (2017)
- Scientific career
- Fields: Mathematics
- Workplaces: Purdue University
- Doctoral advisor: Carlos Kenig

Donatella Danielli (born 1966) is a professor of mathematics at Arizona State University and is known for her contributions to partial differential equations, calculus of variations and geometric measure theory, with specific emphasis on free boundary problems.

== Career ==
She received a Laurea cum Laude in Mathematics from the University of Bologna, Italy in 1989. She completed her doctorate in 1999 at Purdue, under the supervision of Carlos Kenig. Before joining the Purdue University faculty in 2001, she held positions at The Johns Hopkins University and at the Institut Mittag-Leffler in Sweden. She was also a visiting fellow at the Isaac Newton Institute for Mathematical Sciences in 2014. She serves as member-at-large in the executive committee of the Association for Women in Mathematics.

== Selected awards ==
- National Science Foundation CAREER Award (2003)
- Simons Fellow in Mathematics (2014)
- Fellow of the American Mathematical Society since 2017 "for contributions to partial differential equations and geometric measure theory, and for service to the mathematical community".
- Fellow of the Association for Women in Mathematics since 2020 for "her generous and consistent involvement in, and remarkable impact on, a large number of excellent local, national, and international initiatives to support interest and involvement of women in mathematics at all levels; and for remarkable, pioneering contributions positioning her as a role model for more junior mathematicians, particularly women".

== Selected publications ==
=== Books ===
- Capogna, Luca, et al. An introduction to the Heisenberg group and the sub-Riemannian isoperimetric problem. Vol. 259. Springer Science & Business Media, 2007.

=== Papers ===
- Danielli, Donatella (1995). "Regularity at the boundary for solutions of nonlinear subelliptic equations". Indiana University Mathematics Journal. 44 (1): 269–286. doi:10.1512/iumj.1995.44.1988.
- Capogna, Luca; Danielli, Donatella; Garofalo, Nicola (1996). "Capacitary estimates and the local behavior of solutions of nonlinear subelliptic equations". American Journal of Mathematics. 118 (6): 1153–1196. doi:10.1353/ajm.1996.0046. S2CID 120651754.
- Danielli, Donatella; Petrosyan, Arshak (2005). "A minimum problem with free boundary for a degenerate quasilinear operator". Calculus of Variations and Partial Differential Equations. 23 (1): 97–124. doi:10.1007/s00526-004-0294-5.
- Danielli, Donatella; Garofalo, Nicola; Nhieu, Duy-Minh (2006). "Non-doubling Ahlfors measures, perimeter measures, and the characterization of the trace spaces of Sobolev functions in Carnot–Carathéodory spaces". Memoirs of the American Mathematical Society. 182 (857). doi:10.1090/memo/0857.
- Danielli, Donatella, ed. (2007). Recent developments in nonlinear partial differential equations. Proceedings of the 2nd Symposium on Analysis and PDEs held at Purdue University, June 7–10, 2004. Contemporary Mathematics. Vol. 439. American Mathematical Society, Providence, RI. doi:10.1090/memo/0857.
- Capogna, Luca; Danielli, Donatella; Pauls, Scott D. (2007). Tyson, Jeremy T. (ed.). An introduction to the Heisenberg group and the sub-Riemannian isoperimetric problem. Progress in Mathematics. Vol. 259. Birkhäuser Verlag, Basel. doi:10.1007/978-3-7643-8133-2. ISBN 978-3-7643-8132-5.
- Danielli, Donatella; Garofalo, Nicola; Petrosyan, Arshak (2007). "The sub-elliptic obstacle problem: $C^{1,\alpha}$ regularity of the free boundary in Carnot groups of step two". Advances in Mathematics. 211 (2): 485–516. doi:10.1016/j.aim.2006.08.008.
- Danielli, Donatella; Garofalo, Nicola; Nhieu, Duy-Minh (2007). "Sub-Riemannian calculus on hypersurfaces in Carnot groups". Advances in Mathematics. 215 (1): 292–378. arXiv:math/0607559. doi:10.1016/j.aim.2007.04.004.
- Danielli, Donatella; Garofalo, Nicola; Nhieu, Duy-Minh; Pauls, Scott D. (2009). "Instability of graphical strips and a positive answer to the Bernstein problem in the Heisenberg group H1". Journal of Differential Geometry. 81 (2): 251–295. arXiv:math/0608516. doi:10.4310/jdg/1231856262.
