= 申 =

申 may refer to:

- The ninth of the Earthly Branches
  - Monkey (zodiac), the ninth sign of the Chinese zodiac
- Shēn (surname), a Chinese surname
- Shin (Korean surname)
- Abbreviation for Application for employment
