= Shēn (surname) =

Chinese family name

Shēn is the pinyin romanization of the Chinese surname 申.

Shen is the 298th surname in the Song-era Hundred Family Surnames.

== Romanisation ==
申 is romanised as Shin (신) in Korean and Thân in Vietnamese.

== Distribution ==
Shen is unlisted among the 100 most common surname in mainland China in 2007 or among the 100 most common surnames on Taiwan in 2005.

Likewise, although Chinese make up the largest part of America's Asian and Pacific Islander population, none of the romanizations of 申 appeared among the 1000 most common surnames during the AD 2000 US census.

Nonetheless, it is regionally popular in the Jiangsu and Zhejiang region around the mouth of the Yangtze River.

In Korea Shin is the 13th most common surname (sorted by Hanja character).

== Origin ==
As is common with Chinese surnames, the modern Shen family arose from various unrelated sources.

One origin of the Shen was the state of Shen (申) established by the Si (姒) family during the Xia dynasty. During the early Zhou dynasty, the state of Jiang conquered this Shen and its people migrated south to Shenlu in Chu, adopting Shen as their clan name.

Another origin of the Shen was with a second state of Shen (also 申). This Shen was originally ruled by the Ying dynasty, who claimed descent from a son of the Ku Emperor named Shishen. When this Shen was destroyed by King Zhao of Zhou, its rulers and vassals also adopted Shen as their clan name.

A third state of Shen (also 申) was ruled by a cadet branch of the Zhou royal family, whose ancestral name was Jiang (姜), and arose from territory granted to King Xuan's maternal uncle from the lands of the former state of Xie. This land's rulers and people also ended in adopting the region as their clan name following its destruction.

== Notable people ==
- Shen Baoxu (申包胥; fl. 506 BCE), Chu State courtier
- Shen Buhai (申不害; c. 400 BC–c. 337 BC), Zheng State statesman, reformer, diplomat
- Shen Dan (申耽; died after 220), Han Dynasty warlord and military general
- Shen Fan (申凡; born 1952), Chinese contemporary artist
- Shen Jilan (申纪兰; 1929–2020), Chinese politician
- Shen Liming (申黎明; born 1964), Chinese politician
- Shen Maomao (申毛毛; born 1957), Chinese former javelin thrower
- Shen Panwen (申泮文; 1916–2017), Chinese chemist
- Shen Shixing (申時行; 1535–1614), Ming Dynasty politician and academic
- Shen Si (申思; born 1973), Chinese former footballer
- Shen Weichen (申维辰; born 1956), Chinese former politician
- Shen Xue (申雪; born 1978), Chinese retired pair skater, Olympic gold medalist
- Shen Yang (Eighteen Kingdoms) (申陽), Kingdom of Henan ruler
- Shen Yi (Three Kingdoms) (申儀; died after 227), Han Dynasty warlord and military general
- Shen Yunpu (申云浦; 1916–1991), Chinese politician
- Zhongwei Shen (申仲伟; born c. 1964), Chinese-American mathematician
