= Segal–Bargmann space =

Hilbert space of square-integrable holomorphic functions of n complex variables

In mathematics, the Segal–Bargmann space (for Irving Segal and Valentine Bargmann), also known as the Bargmann space or Bargmann–Fock space, is the space of holomorphic functions F in n complex variables satisfying the square-integrability condition:

$$\|F\|^2 := \pi^{-n} \int_{\Complex^n} |F(z)|^2 \exp(-|z|^2)\,dz < \infty,$$

where here dz denotes the 2n-dimensional Lebesgue measure on $\Complex^n.$ It is a Hilbert space with respect to the associated inner product:

$$\langle F\mid G\rangle = \pi^{-n} \int_{\Complex^n} \overline{F(z)}G(z)\exp(-|z|^2)\,dz.$$

The space was introduced in the mathematical physics literature separately by Bargmann and Segal in the early 1960s; see Bargmann (1961) and Segal (1963). Basic information about the material in this section may be found in Folland (1989) and Hall (2000). Segal worked from the beginning in the infinite-dimensional setting; see Baez, Segal & Zhou (1992) and Section 10 of Hall (2000) for more information on this aspect of the subject.

== Properties ==
A basic property of this space is that pointwise evaluation is continuous, meaning that for each $a \in \Complex^n,$ there is a constant C such that

$$|F(a)| < C\|F\|.$$

It then follows from the Riesz representation theorem that there exists a unique F_{a} in the Segal–Bargmann space such that

$$F(a) = \langle F_a\mid F\rangle.$$

The function F_{a} may be computed explicitly as

$$F_a(z) = \exp(\overline{a}\cdot z)$$

where, explicitly,

$$\overline{a}\cdot z = \sum_{j=1}^n \overline{a_j}z_j.$$

The function F_{a} is called the coherent state (applied in mathematical physics) with parameter a, and the function

$$\kappa(a,z) := \overline{F_a(z)}$$

is known as the reproducing kernel for the Segal–Bargmann space. Note that

$$F(a) = \langle F_a\mid F\rangle = \pi^{-n} \int_{\Complex^n} \kappa(a,z)F(z)\exp(-|z|^2)\,dz,$$

meaning that integration against the reproducing kernel simply gives back (i.e., reproduces) the function F, provided, of course that F is an element of the space (and in particular is holomorphic).

Note that

$$\|F_a\|^2 = \langle F_a\mid F_a\rangle = F_a(a) = \exp(|a|^2).$$

It follows from the Cauchy–Schwarz inequality that elements of the Segal–Bargmann space satisfy the pointwise bounds

$$\left|F(a)\right| \leq \left\|F_a\right\| \left\|F\right\| = \exp(|a|^2/2) \left\|F\right\|.$$

== Quantum mechanical interpretation ==
One may interpret a unit vector in the Segal–Bargmann space as the wave function for a quantum particle moving in $\R^n.$ In this view, $\Complex^n$ plays the role of the classical phase space, whereas $\R^n$ is the configuration space. The restriction that F be holomorphic is essential to this interpretation; if F were an arbitrary square-integrable function, it could be localized into an arbitrarily small region of the phase space, which would go against the uncertainty principle. Since, however, F is required to be holomorphic, it satisfies the pointwise bounds described above, which provides a limit on how concentrated F can be in any region of phase space.

Given a unit vector F in the Segal–Bargmann space, the quantity

$$\pi^{-n} |F(z)|^2 \exp(-|z|^2)$$

may be interpreted as a sort of phase space probability density for the particle. Since the above quantity is manifestly non-negative, it cannot coincide with the Wigner function of the particle, which usually has some negative values. In fact, the above density coincides with the Husimi function of the particle, which is obtained from the Wigner function by smearing with a Gaussian. This connection will be made more precise below, after we introduce the Segal–Bargmann transform.

== The canonical commutation relations ==
One may introduce annihilation operators $a_j$ and creation operators $a_j^*$ on the Segal–Bargmann space by setting

$$a_j = \partial /\partial z_j$$

and

$$a_j^* = z_j$$

These operators satisfy the same relations as the usual creation and annihilation operators, namely, the $a_j$ and $a_j^*$ commute among themselves and

$$\left [a_j, a_k^* \right ] = \delta_{j,k}$$

Furthermore, the adjoint of $a_j$ with respect to the Segal–Bargmann inner product is $a_j^*.$ (This is suggested by the notation, but not at all obvious from the formulas for $a_j$ and $a_j^*$!) Indeed, Bargmann was led to introduce the particular form of the inner product on the Segal–Bargmann space precisely so that the creation and annihilation operators would be adjoints of each other.

We may now construct self-adjoint "position" and "momentum" operators A_{j} and B_{j} by the formulas:

$$\begin{align}
A_j &= \frac{1}{ \sqrt{2}} (a_j + a_j^*), &
B_j &= \frac{1}{i\sqrt{2}} (a_j - a_j^*)
\end{align}$$

These operators satisfy the ordinary canonical commutation relations, and it can be shown that they act irreducibly on the Segal–Bargmann space; see Section 14.4 of Hall (2013).

== The Segal–Bargmann transform ==
Since the operators A_{j} and B_{j} from the previous section satisfy the Weyl relations and act irreducibly on the Segal–Bargmann space, the Stone–von Neumann theorem applies. Thus, there is a unitary map B from the position Hilbert space $L^2(\R^n)$ to the Segal–Bargmann space that intertwines these operators with the usual position and momentum operators.

The map B may be computed explicitly as a modified double Weierstrass transform,

$$(Bf)(z) = \int_{\R^n} \exp[-\tfrac{1}{2} (z \cdot z - 2 \sqrt{2} z \cdot x + x \cdot x)]f(x) \, dx,$$

where dx is the n-dimensional Lebesgue measure on $\R^n$ and where z is in $\Complex^n.$ See Bargmann (1961) and Section 14.4 of Hall (2013). One can also describe (Bf)(z) as the inner product of f with an appropriately normalized coherent state with parameter z, where, now, we express the coherent states in the position representation instead of in the Segal–Bargmann space.

We may now be more precise about the connection between the Segal–Bargmann space and the Husimi function of a particle. If f is a unit vector in $L^2(\R^n),$ then we may form a probability density on $\Complex^n$ as

$$\pi^{-n} |(Bf)(z)|^2 \exp(-|z|^2) ~.$$

The claim is then that the above density is the Husimi function of f, which may be obtained from the Wigner function of f by convolving with a double Gaussian (the Weierstrass transform). This fact is easily verified by using the formula for Bf along with the standard formula for the Husimi function in terms of coherent states.

Since B is unitary, its Hermitian adjoint is its inverse. Recalling that the measure on $\Complex^n$ is $e^{-|z|^2}\,dz$, we thus obtain one inversion formula for B as

$$f(x) = \int_{\Complex^n} \exp[-\tfrac{1}{2}(\overline{z} \cdot \overline{z} - 2 \sqrt{2} \overline{z} \cdot x + x \cdot x)](Bf)(z) e^{-|z|^2}\, dz.$$

Since, however, Bf is a holomorphic function, there can be many integrals involving Bf that give the same value. (Think of the Cauchy integral formula.) Thus, there can be many different inversion formulas for the Segal–Bargmann transform B.

Another useful inversion formula is

$$f(x) = C \exp(-|x|^2/2) \int_{\R^n} (Bf)(x+iy)\exp(-|y|^2/2) \, dy,$$

where

$$C = \pi^{-n/4} (2\pi)^{-n/2}.$$

This inversion formula may be understood as saying that the position "wave function" f may be obtained from the phase-space "wave function" Bf by integrating out the momentum variables. This is to be contrasted to the Wigner function, where the position probability density is obtained from the phase space (quasi-)probability density by integrating out the momentum variables.

== Generalizations ==
There are various generalizations of the Segal–Bargmann space and transform. In one of these, the role of the configuration space $\R^n$ is played by the group manifold of a compact Lie group, such as SU(N). The role of the phase space $\Complex^n$ is then played by the complexification of the compact Lie group, such as $\operatorname{SL}(N, \Complex)$ in the case of SU(N). The various Gaussians appearing in the ordinary Segal–Bargmann space and transform are replaced by heat kernels. This generalized Segal–Bargmann transform could be applied, for example, to the rotational degrees of freedom of a rigid body, where the configuration space is the compact Lie group SO(3).

This generalized Segal–Bargmann transform gives rise to a system of coherent states, known as heat kernel coherent states. These have been used widely in the literature on loop quantum gravity.

== See also ==
- Theta representation
- Hardy space

== Sources ==
- Bargmann, V. (1961), "On a Hilbert space of analytic functions and an associated integral transform", Communications on Pure and Applied Mathematics, 14 (3): 187, doi:10.1002/cpa.3160140303, hdl:10338.dmlcz/143587
- Segal, I. E. (1963), "Mathematical problems of relativistic physics", in Kac, M. (ed.), Proceedings of the Summer Seminar, Boulder, Colorado, 1960, Vol. II, Lectures in Applied Mathematics, American Mathematical Society, Chap. VI, LCCN 62-21480
- Folland, G. (1989), Harmonic Analysis in Phase Space, Princeton University Press, ISBN 978-0691085289
- Baez, J.; Segal, I. E.; Zhou, Z. (1992), Introduction to Algebraic and Constructive Quantum Field Theory, Princeton University Press, ISBN 978-0691605128
- Hall, B. C (2000), "Holomorphic methods in analysis and mathematical physics", in Pérez-Esteva, S.; Villegas-Blas, C. (eds.), First Summer School in Analysis and Mathematical Physics: Quantization, the Segal-Bargmann Transform and Semiclassical Analysis, Contemporary Mathematics, vol. 260, AMS, pp. 1–59, ISBN 978-0-8218-2115-2
- Hall, B. C. (2013), Quantum Theory for Mathematicians, Graduate Texts in Mathematics, vol. 267, Springer Verlag, doi:10.1007/978-1-4614-7116-5, ISBN 978-1-4614-7115-8, S2CID 117837329
