= Matrix mechanics =

Formulation of quantum mechanics

Matrix mechanics is a formulation of quantum mechanics created by Werner Heisenberg, Max Born, and Pascual Jordan in 1925. It was the first conceptually autonomous and logically consistent formulation of quantum mechanics. Its account of quantum jumps supplanted the Bohr model's electron orbits. It did so by interpreting the physical properties of particles as matrices that evolve in time. It is equivalent to the Schrödinger wave formulation of quantum mechanics, as manifest in Dirac's bra–ket notation.

In some contrast to the wave formulation, it produces spectra of (mostly energy) operators by purely algebraic, ladder operator methods. Relying on these methods, Wolfgang Pauli derived the hydrogen atom spectrum in 1926, before the development of wave mechanics.

== Development of matrix mechanics ==
In 1925, Werner Heisenberg, Max Born, and Pascual Jordan formulated the matrix mechanics representation of quantum mechanics.

=== Epiphany at Heligoland ===
In 1925 Werner Heisenberg was working in Göttingen on the problem of calculating the spectral lines of hydrogen. By May 1925 he began trying to describe atomic systems by observables only. On June 7, after weeks of failing to alleviate his hay fever with aspirin and cocaine, Heisenberg left for the pollen-free North Sea island of Heligoland. While there, in between climbing and memorizing poems from Goethe's West-östlicher Diwan, he continued to ponder the spectral issue and eventually realised that adopting non-commuting observables might solve the problem. He later wrote:

It was about three o' clock at night when the final result of the calculation lay before me. At first I was deeply shaken. I was so excited that I could not think of sleep. So I left the house and awaited the sunrise on the top of a rock.

=== The three fundamental papers ===
After Heisenberg returned to Göttingen, he showed Wolfgang Pauli his calculations, commenting at one point:

Everything is still vague and unclear to me, but it seems as if the electrons will no more move on orbits.

On July 9 Heisenberg gave the same paper of his calculations to Max Born, saying that "he had written a crazy paper and did not dare to send it in for publication, and that Born should read it and advise him" prior to publication. Heisenberg then departed for a while, leaving Born to analyse the paper.

In the paper, Heisenberg formulated quantum theory without sharply-defined electron orbits, directly advocating for a re-interpretation of quantum theory that only focused on experimental observables like frequencies and transition probabilities.

Before Heisenberg's paper, Hendrik Kramers had calculated the relative intensities of spectral lines in the Sommerfeld model by interpreting the Fourier coefficients of the orbits as intensities. But his answer, like all other calculations in the old quantum theory, was only correct for large orbits.

Heisenberg, after a collaboration with Kramers, began to believe that the transition probabilities describing quantum transitions would need a new interpretation different from classical mechanics because Heisenberg believed that the frequencies that should appear in a series describing the position of the electron should only be the ones that are experimentally observed in quantum transitions (like through spectral lines), not the complete set of spatial frequencies that come from making a traditional Fourier series of classical orbits.

The quantities in Heisenberg's original formulation involved a series that described position as a series of "virtual oscillators" with two indices, with the two indices representing the initial and final states of a quantum transition. Rather than following the multiplication rule as expected from multiplying Fourier series, Heisenberg formed a non-commutative multiplication rule to ensure that multiplying position states would preserve the frequencies that are only found in the quantum transitions.

When Born read the paper, he recognized the formulation, particularly the non-commutative multiplication rule, as one which could be transcribed and extended to the systematic language of matrices, which he had learned from his study under Jakob Rosanes at Breslau University. Born, with the help of his assistant and former student Pascual Jordan, began immediately to make the transcription and extension, and they submitted their results for publication; the paper was received for publication just 60 days after Heisenberg's paper.

A follow-on paper was submitted for publication before the end of the year by all three authors. (A brief review of Born's role in the development of the matrix mechanics formulation of quantum mechanics along with a discussion of the key formula involving the non-commutativity of the probability amplitudes can be found in an article by Jeremy Bernstein. A detailed historical and technical account can be found in Mehra and Rechenberg's book The Historical Development of Quantum Theory. Volume 3. The Formulation of Matrix Mechanics and Its Modifications 1925–1926.)

The three fundamental papers:

- W. Heisenberg, Über quantentheoretische Umdeutung kinematischer und mechanischer Beziehungen, Zeitschrift für Physik, 33, 879-893, 1925 (received July 29, 1925). [English translation in: B. L. van der Waerden, editor, Sources of Quantum Mechanics (Dover Publications, 1968) ISBN 0-486-61881-1 (English title: Quantum-Theoretical Re-interpretation of Kinematic and Mechanical Relations).]
- M. Born and P. Jordan, Zur Quantenmechanik, Zeitschrift für Physik, 34, 858-888, 1925 (received September 27, 1925). [English translation in: B. L. van der Waerden, editor, Sources of Quantum Mechanics (Dover Publications, 1968) ISBN 0-486-61881-1 (English title: On Quantum Mechanics).]
- M. Born, W. Heisenberg, and P. Jordan, Zur Quantenmechanik II, Zeitschrift für Physik, 35, 557-615, 1926 (received November 16, 1925). [English translation in: B. L. van der Waerden, editor, Sources of Quantum Mechanics (Dover Publications, 1968) ISBN 0-486-61881-1 (English title: On Quantum Mechanics II).]

Up until this time, matrices were seldom used by physicists; they were considered to belong to the realm of pure mathematics, thus requiring Born and Jordan's paper to introduce matrix algebra to physicists unaware of their use. Gustav Mie had used them in a paper on electrodynamics in 1912 and Born had used them in his work on the lattices theory of crystals in 1921. While matrices were used in these cases, the algebra of matrices with their multiplication did not enter the picture as they did in the matrix formulation of quantum mechanics.

Born, however, had learned matrix algebra from Rosanes, as already noted, but Born had also learned Hilbert's theory of integral equations and quadratic forms for an infinite number of variables as was apparent from a citation by Born of Hilbert's work Grundzüge einer allgemeinen Theorie der Linearen Integralgleichungen published in 1912.

Jordan, too, was well equipped for the task. For a number of years, he had been an assistant to Richard Courant at Göttingen in the preparation of Courant and David Hilbert's book Methoden der mathematischen Physik I, which was published in 1924. This book, fortuitously, contained a great many of the mathematical tools necessary for the continued development of quantum mechanics.

In 1926, John von Neumann became assistant to David Hilbert, and he would coin the term Hilbert space to describe the algebra and analysis which were used in the development of quantum mechanics.

A linchpin contribution to this formulation was achieved in Dirac's reinterpretation/synthesis paper of 1925, which invented the language and framework usually employed today, in full display of the noncommutative structure of the entire construction.

=== Heisenberg's reasoning ===
Before matrix mechanics, the old quantum theory described the motion of a particle by a classical orbit, with well defined position and momentum X(t) , P(t) , with the restriction that the time integral over one period T of the momentum times the velocity must be a positive integer multiple of the Planck constant ( h ) as described by the Sommerfeld-Wilson quantization condition
$$\ \int_0^T P \; \frac{\ \mathrm{d} X\ }{ \mathrm{d} t } \; \mathrm{d}t\ =\ \int_0^T P \; \mathrm{d} X = n\ h ~.$$
While this restriction correctly selects orbits with the right energy values E_{n} , the old quantum formalism did not describe time dependent processes, such as the emission or absorption of radiation.

When a classical particle is weakly coupled to a radiation field, so that the radiative damping can be neglected, it will emit radiation in a pattern that repeats itself every orbital period. The frequencies that make up the outgoing wave are then integer multiples of the orbital frequency, and this is a reflection of the fact that X(t) is periodic, so that its Fourier representation has frequencies ( 2 π n )/ T only.
$$X(t)\ = \sum_{n=-\infty}^\infty  e^{ i\ 2\pi n t / T} X_n  ~.$$
The coefficients X_{n} are complex numbers. The ones with negative frequencies must be the complex conjugates of the ones with positive frequencies, so that X(t) will always be real,
$$X_n = X_{-n}^* ~.$$

A quantum mechanical particle, on the other hand, cannot emit radiation continuously; it can only emit photons. Under the Bohr model, for a quantum particle starting in quantum number n that then emits a photon by transitioning to orbit number m , the energy of the photon is E_{n} − E_{m} , that gives a photon of frequency is ( E_{n} − E_{m} )/ h .

For large n and m , but with n − m relatively small, Bohr's correspondence principle expects the same classical frequencies
$$E_n - E_m \approx \frac{\ h\ (n - m)\ }{ T } ~.$$
In the formula above, T is the classical period of either orbit n or orbit m , since the difference between them is higher order in h . But for small n and m , or if n − m is large, the frequencies are not integer multiples of any single frequency.

Since in classical mechanics, the frequencies that the particle emits are the same as the frequencies in the Fourier description of its motion, Heisenberg inferred that in the time-dependent description of the particle, there should be something oscillating with frequency ( E_{n} − E_{m} )/ h . Heisenberg called this quantity X_{nm} , and demanded that it should reduce to the classical Fourier coefficients in the classical limit. For large values of n and m but with n − m relatively small, X_{nm} is the (n − m)th Fourier coefficient of the classical motion at orbit n . Since X_{nm} has opposite frequency to X_{mn} , the condition that X is real becomes
$$X_{nm} = X_{mn}^* ~.$$

By definition, X_{nm} only has the frequency ( E_{n} − E_{m} )/h , so its time evolution may be described as:
$$\ X_{nm}(t)\ =\ e^{i\ 2\pi \left( E_n - E_m \right) t / h}\ X_{nm}(0)\ =\ e^{ i\ \left( E_n - E_m \right) t / \hbar}\ X_{nm}(0) ~.$$
This is the original form of Heisenberg's equation of motion.

Given two arrays X_{nm} and P_{nm} describing two physical quantities, when modeling each as classical Fourier series, it is expected that their multiplication X_{nk} P_{km} should also result in a new frequency as part of a new Fourier series. Whilst the Fourier coefficients of the product of two quantities is the convolution of the Fourier coefficients of each one separately, Heisenberg changed the multiplication rule to ensure that when multiplying each component, the new frequencies would only correspond to frequencies that already existed in the quantum orbit:
$$\ \left( X\ P \right)_{mn}\ =\ \sum_{k=0}^\infty\ X_{mk}\ P_{kn} ~.$$

Born noticed that this is the law of matrix multiplication, so that the position, the momentum, the energy, all the observable quantities in the theory, are interpreted as matrices. Under this multiplication rule, the product depends on the order: X P is different from P X .

The X matrix is a complete description of the motion of a quantum mechanical particle. Because the frequencies in the quantum motion are not multiples of a common frequency, the matrix elements cannot be interpreted as the Fourier coefficients of a sharp classical trajectory. Nevertheless, as matrices, X(t) and P(t) satisfy the classical equations of motion; also see Ehrenfest's theorem, below.

=== Matrix basics ===
When it was introduced by Werner Heisenberg, Max Born and Pascual Jordan in 1925, matrix mechanics was not immediately accepted and was a source of controversy, at first. Schrödinger's later introduction of wave mechanics was greatly favored.

Part of the reason was that Heisenberg's formulation was in an odd mathematical language, for the time, while Schrödinger's formulation was based on familiar wave equations. But there was also a deeper sociological reason. Quantum mechanics had been developing by two paths, one led by Einstein, who emphasized the wave–particle duality he proposed for photons, and the other led by Bohr, that emphasized the discrete energy states and quantum jumps that Bohr discovered. De Broglie had reproduced the discrete energy states within Einstein's framework – the quantum condition is the standing wave condition, and this gave hope to those in the Einstein school that all the discrete aspects of quantum mechanics would be subsumed into a continuous wave mechanics.

Matrix mechanics, on the other hand, came from the Bohr school, which was concerned with discrete energy states and quantum jumps. Bohr's followers did not appreciate physical models that pictured electrons as waves, or as anything at all. They preferred to focus on the quantities that were directly connected to experiments.

In atomic physics, spectroscopy gave observational data on atomic transitions arising from the interactions of atoms with light quanta. The Bohr school required that only those quantities that were in principle measurable by spectroscopy should appear in the theory. These quantities include the energy levels and their intensities but they do not include the exact location of a particle in its Bohr orbit. It is very hard to imagine an experiment that could determine whether an electron in the ground state of a hydrogen atom is to the right or to the left of the nucleus. It was a deep conviction that such questions did not have an answer.

The matrix formulation was built on the premise that all physical observables are represented by matrices, whose elements are indexed by two different energy levels. The set of eigenvalues of the matrix were eventually understood to be the set of all possible values that the observable can have. Since Heisenberg's matrices are Hermitian, the eigenvalues are real.

If an observable is measured and the result is a certain eigenvalue, the corresponding eigenvector is the state of the system immediately after the measurement. The act of measurement in matrix mechanics collapses the state of the system. If one measures two observables simultaneously, the state of the system collapses to a common eigenvector of the two observables. Since most matrices don't have any eigenvectors in common, most observables can never be measured precisely at the same time. This is the uncertainty principle.

If two matrices share their eigenvectors, they can be simultaneously diagonalized. In the basis where they are both diagonal, it is clear that their product does not depend on their order because multiplication of diagonal matrices is just multiplication of numbers. The uncertainty principle, by contrast, is an expression of the fact that often two matrices A and B do not always commute, i.e., that AB − BA does not necessarily equal 0. The fundamental commutation relation of matrix mechanics,
$$\sum_k \left( X_{nk} P_{km} - P_{nk} X_{km} \right) = i\hbar \, \delta_{nm}$$
implies then that there are no states that simultaneously have a definite position and momentum.

This principle of uncertainty holds for many other pairs of observables as well. For example, the energy does not commute with the position either, so it is impossible to precisely determine the position and energy of an electron in an atom.

=== Nobel Prize ===
In 1928, Albert Einstein nominated Heisenberg, Born, and Jordan for the Nobel Prize in Physics. The announcement of the Nobel Prize in Physics for 1932 was delayed until November 1933. It was at that time that it was announced Heisenberg had won the Prize for 1932 "for the creation of quantum mechanics, the application of which has, inter alia, led to the discovery of the allotropic forms of hydrogen" and Erwin Schrödinger and Paul Adrien Maurice Dirac shared the 1933 Prize "for the discovery of new productive forms of atomic theory".

On November 25, 1933, Born received a letter from Heisenberg in which he said he had been delayed in writing due to a "bad conscience" that he alone had received the Prize "for work done in Göttingen in collaboration – you, Jordan and I". Heisenberg went on to say that Born and Jordan's contribution to quantum mechanics cannot be changed by "a wrong decision from the outside". In 1954, Heisenberg wrote an article honoring Max Planck for his insight in 1900. In the article, Heisenberg credited Born and Jordan for the final mathematical formulation of matrix mechanics and Heisenberg went on to stress how great their contributions were to quantum mechanics, which were not "adequately acknowledged in the public eye".

== Mathematical development ==
Once Heisenberg introduced the matrices for X and P, he could find their matrix elements in special cases by guesswork, guided by the correspondence principle. Since the matrix elements are the quantum mechanical analogs of Fourier coefficients of the classical orbits, the simplest case is the harmonic oscillator, where the classical position and momentum, X(t) and P(t), are sinusoidal.

=== Harmonic oscillator ===
In units where the mass and frequency of the oscillator are equal to one (see nondimensionalization), the energy of the oscillator is
$$H = \tfrac{1}{2} \left(\ P^2 + X^2 \right) ~.$$

The level sets of H are the clockwise orbits, and they are nested circles in phase space. The classical orbit with energy E is

$\ X( t ) = + \sqrt{2E\ }\ \cos( t ) \qquad$ and $\qquad P(t) = - \sqrt{2E\ }\ \sin( t ) ~.$

The old quantum condition dictates that the integral of P dX over an orbit, which is the area of the circle in phase space, must be an integer multiple of the Planck constant. The area of the circle of radius √2 E is 2π E . So
$$E = \frac{\ n\ h\ }{ 2 \pi } = n\ \hbar\ ,$$
or, in natural units where ħ ≡ 1 , the energy becomes some whole number.

The Fourier components of X( t ) and P( t ) are simple, and even more so when they are re-expressed as a sum and difference of position X and momentum P :

$\ A( t ) = X( t ) + i\ P( t ) = \sqrt{2E\ }\ e^{-i\ t} \qquad$ and $\qquad A^\dagger(t) = X( t ) - i\ P( t ) = \sqrt{2E\ }\ e^{+i\ t} ~.$

Both A and A^{†} have only a single frequency, and X and P can be recovered from the similar sum and difference of A and A^{†} .

Since A( t ) has a classical Fourier series with only the lowest frequency, and the matrix element A_{mn} is the (m − n)th Fourier coefficient of the classical orbit, the matrix for A is nonzero only on the line just above the diagonal, where it is equal to √2E_{n} . The matrix for A^{†} is likewise only nonzero on the line below the diagonal, with the same elements. Thus, from A and A^{†} , reconstruction yields
$$\sqrt{2\ }\ X( 0 )= \sqrt{\hbar\ } \; \begin{bmatrix}
0 & \sqrt{1\ } & 0 & 0 & 0 & \cdots \\
\sqrt{1\ } & 0 & \sqrt{2\ } & 0 & 0 & \cdots \\
0 & \sqrt{2\ } & 0 & \sqrt{3\ } & 0 & \cdots \\
0 & 0 & \sqrt{3\ } & 0 & \sqrt{4\ } & \cdots \\
\vdots & \vdots & \vdots & \vdots & \vdots & \ddots \\
\end{bmatrix}\ ,$$
and
$$\sqrt{2\ }\ P( 0 ) = \sqrt{\hbar\ } \; \begin{bmatrix}
0 & -i\sqrt{1\ } & 0 & 0 & 0 & \cdots \\
i\sqrt{1} & 0 & -i\sqrt{2\ } & 0 & 0 & \cdots \\
0 & i\sqrt{2\ } & 0 & -i\sqrt{3\ } & 0 & \cdots \\
0 & 0 & i\sqrt{3\ } & 0 & -i\sqrt{4\ } & \cdots\\
\vdots & \vdots & \vdots & \vdots & \vdots & \ddots \\
\end{bmatrix}\ ,$$
which, up to the choice of units, are the Heisenberg matrices for the harmonic oscillator. Both matrices are Hermitian, since they are constructed from the Fourier coefficients of real quantities.

Finding X( t ) and P( t ) is direct, since they are quantum Fourier coefficients so they evolve simply with time, as

$\ X_{mn}( t )\ =\ X_{mn}(0)\ e^{i\ (E_m - E_n)t} \qquad$ and $\qquad P_{mn}( t )\ =\ P_{mn}( 0 )\ e^{i\ (E_m -E_n)t} ~.$

The matrix product of X and P is not hermitian, but has a real and imaginary part. The real part is one half the symmetric expression X P + P X , while the imaginary part is proportional to the commutator, which is written as
$$\ \bigl[\ X\ ,\ P\ \bigr]\ \equiv\ X\ P - P\ X ~.$$
In the special case of the harmonic oscillator, it is simple to verify explicitly that X P − P X is i ħ I , where I is the identity matrix.

It is likewise simple to verify that the matrix
$$H = \tfrac{1}{2} \left(\ X^2 + P^2 \right)$$
is a diagonal matrix, with eigenvalues E_{i} .

=== Conservation of energy ===
The harmonic oscillator is an important case. Finding the matrices is easier than determining the general conditions from these special forms. For this reason, Heisenberg investigated the anharmonic oscillator, with Hamiltonian
$$H = \tfrac12 P^2 + \tfrac12 X^2 + \varepsilon X^3 ~.$$

In this case, the X and P matrices are no longer simple off-diagonal matrices, since the corresponding classical orbits are slightly squashed and displaced, so that they have Fourier coefficients at every classical frequency. To determine the matrix elements, Heisenberg required that the classical equations of motion be obeyed as matrix equations,
$$\frac{dX}{dt} = P~, \qquad \frac{dP}{dt} = - X - 3 \varepsilon X^2 ~.$$

He noticed that if this could be done, then H, considered as a matrix function of X and P, will have zero time derivative.
$$\frac{dH}{dt} = P*\frac{dP}{dt} + \left( X + 3 \varepsilon X^2 \right)*\frac{dX}{dt} = 0 ~,$$
where A∗B is the anticommutator,
$$A*B = \tfrac12(AB+BA) ~.$$

Given that all the off diagonal elements have a nonzero frequency; H being constant implies that H is diagonal. It was clear to Heisenberg that in this system, the energy could be exactly conserved in an arbitrary quantum system, a very encouraging sign.

The process of emission and absorption of photons seemed to demand that the conservation of energy will hold at best on average. If a wave containing exactly one photon passes over some atoms, and one of them absorbs it, that atom needs to tell the others that they can't absorb the photon anymore. But if the atoms are far apart, any signal cannot reach the other atoms in time, and they might end up absorbing the same photon anyway and dissipating the energy to the environment. When the signal reached them, the other atoms would have to somehow recall that energy. This paradox led Bohr, Kramers and Slater to abandon exact conservation of energy. Heisenberg's formalism, when extended to include the electromagnetic field, was obviously going to sidestep this problem, a hint that the interpretation of the theory will involve wavefunction collapse.

=== Differentiation trick — canonical commutation relations ===
Demanding that the classical equations of motion are preserved is not a strong enough condition to determine the matrix elements. The Planck constant does not appear in the classical equations, so that the matrices could be constructed for many different values of ħ and still satisfy the equations of motion, but with different energy levels.

So, in order to implement his program, Heisenberg needed to use the old quantum condition to fix the energy levels, then fill in the matrices with Fourier coefficients of the classical equations, then alter the matrix coefficients and the energy levels slightly to make sure the classical equations are satisfied. This is clearly not satisfactory. The old quantum conditions refer to the area enclosed by the sharp classical orbits, which do not exist in the new formalism.

The most important thing that Heisenberg discovered is how to translate the old quantum condition into a simple statement in matrix mechanics.

To do this, he investigated the action integral as a matrix quantity,
$$\int_0^T \sum_k P_{mk}(t) \frac{dX_{kn}}{dt} dt \,\, \stackrel{\scriptstyle?}{\approx} \,\, J_{mn} ~.$$

There are several problems with this integral, all stemming from the incompatibility of the matrix formalism with the old picture of orbits. Which period T should be used? Semiclassically, it should be either m or n, but the difference is order ħ, and an answer to order ħ is sought. The quantum condition tells us that J_{mn} is 2πn on the diagonal, so the fact that J is classically constant tells us that the off-diagonal elements are zero.

His crucial insight was to differentiate the quantum condition with respect to n. This idea only makes complete sense in the classical limit, where n is not an integer but the continuous action variable J, but Heisenberg performed analogous manipulations with matrices, where the intermediate expressions are sometimes discrete differences and sometimes derivatives.

In the following discussion, for the sake of clarity, the differentiation will be performed on the classical variables, and the transition to matrix mechanics will be done afterwards, guided by the correspondence principle.

In the classical setting, the derivative is the derivative with respect to J of the integral which defines J, so it is tautologically equal to 1.
$$\begin{align}
{} \frac{d}{dJ } \int_0^T P dX &= 1 \\
&= \int_0^T dt \left( \frac{dP}{dJ} \frac{dX}{dt} + P\frac{d}{dJ}\frac{dX}{dt} \right) \\
&= \int_0^T dt \left( \frac{dP}{dJ} \frac{dX}{dt} - \frac{dP}{dt}\frac{dX}{dJ} \right)
\end{align}$$
where the derivatives dP/dJ and dX/dJ should be interpreted as differences with respect to J at corresponding times on nearby orbits, exactly what would be obtained if the Fourier coefficients of the orbital motion were differentiated. (These derivatives are symplectically orthogonal in phase space to the time derivatives dP/dt and dX/dt).

The final expression is clarified by introducing the variable canonically conjugate to J, which is called the angle variable θ: The derivative with respect to time is a derivative with respect to θ, up to a factor of 2πT,
$$\frac{2\pi}{T} \int_0^T dt \left( \frac{dP}{dJ} \frac{dX}{d\theta} - \frac{dP}{d\theta} \frac{dX}{dJ}\right) = 1 \, .$$
So the quantum condition integral is the average value over one cycle of the Poisson bracket of X and P.

An analogous differentiation of the Fourier series of P dX demonstrates that the off-diagonal elements of the Poisson bracket are all zero. The Poisson bracket of two canonically conjugate variables, such as X and P, is the constant value 1, so this integral really is the average value of 1; so it is 1, as we knew all along, because it is dJ/dJ after all. But Heisenberg, Born and Jordan, unlike Dirac, were not familiar with the theory of Poisson brackets, so, for them, the differentiation effectively evaluated {X, P} in J,θ coordinates.

The Poisson Bracket, unlike the action integral, does have a simple translation to matrix mechanics – it normally corresponds to the imaginary part of the product of two variables, the commutator.

To see this, examine the (antisymmetrized) product of two matrices A and B in the correspondence limit, where the matrix elements are slowly varying functions of the index, keeping in mind that the answer is zero classically.

In the correspondence limit, when indices m, n are large and nearby, while k, r are small, the rate of change of the matrix elements in the diagonal direction is the matrix element of the J derivative of the corresponding classical quantity. So it is possible to shift any matrix element diagonally through the correspondence,
$$A_{(m+r) (n+r)} - A_{mn} \approx r\; \left(\frac{dA}{dJ}\right)_{m n}$$
where the right hand side is really only the (m − n)th Fourier component of dA/dJ at the orbit near m to this semiclassical order, not a full well-defined matrix.

The semiclassical time derivative of a matrix element is obtained up to a factor of i by multiplying by the distance from the diagonal,
$$ik A_{m (m+k)} \approx \left(\frac{T}{2\pi} \frac{dA}{dt}\right)_{m (m+k)} =\left(\frac{dA}{d\theta}\right)_{m (m+k)}\, .$$
since the coefficient A_{m(m+k)} is semiclassically the kth Fourier coefficient of the mth classical orbit.

The imaginary part of the product of A and B can be evaluated by shifting the matrix elements around so as to reproduce the classical answer, which is zero.

The leading nonzero residual is then given entirely by the shifting. Since all the matrix elements are at indices which have a small distance from the large index position (m,m), it helps to introduce two temporary notations: A[r,k] = A_{(m+r)(m+k)} for the matrices, and dA/dJ[r] for the rth Fourier components of classical quantities,
$$\begin{align}
(AB - BA)[0,k] &= \sum_{r=-\infty}^{\infty} \bigl( A[0,r] B[r,k] - A[r,k] B[0,r] \bigr) \\
&= \sum_r \left( A[-r+k,k] + (r-k)\frac{dA}{dJ}[r] \right) \left( B[0,k-r] + r \frac{dB}{dJ}[r-k] \right) - \sum_r A[r,k]B[0,r]\, .
\end{align}$$

Flipping the summation variable in the first sum from r to r′ = k − r, the matrix element becomes,
$$\sum_{r'} \left(A[r',k] - r' \frac{dA}{dJ}[k-r']\right) \left( B[0,r'] +(k-r') \frac{dB}{dJ}[r']\right)- \sum_r A[r,k] B[0,r]$$
and it is clear that the principal (classical) part cancels.

The leading quantum part, neglecting the higher order product of derivatives in the residual expression, is then equal to
$$\sum_{r'} \left( \frac{dB}{dJ}[r'](k-r')A[r',k] - \frac{dA}{dJ}[k-r'] r' B[0,r']\right)$$
so that, finally,
$$(AB - BA)[0,k] =\sum_{r'} \left( \frac{dB}{dJ}[r']i\frac{dA}{d\theta}[k-r'] - \frac{dA}{dJ}[k-r'] i \frac{dB}{d\theta}[r']\right)$$
which can be identified with i times the kth classical Fourier component of the Poisson bracket.

Heisenberg's original differentiation trick was eventually extended to a full semiclassical derivation of the quantum condition, in collaboration with Born and Jordan. Once they were able to establish that
$$i\hbar \{X,P\}_\mathrm{PB} \qquad \longmapsto \qquad [ X , P ] \equiv XP - PX = i\hbar \, ,$$
this condition replaced and extended the old quantization rule, allowing the matrix elements of P and X for an arbitrary system to be determined simply from the form of the Hamiltonian.

The new quantization rule was assumed to be universally true, even though the derivation from the old quantum theory required semiclassical reasoning. (A full quantum treatment, however, for more elaborate arguments of the brackets, was appreciated in the 1940s to amount to extending Poisson brackets to Moyal brackets.)

=== State vectors and the Heisenberg equation ===
To make the transition to standard quantum mechanics, the most important further addition was the quantum state vector, now written |ψ⟩, which is the vector that the matrices act on. Without the state vector, it is not clear which particular motion the Heisenberg matrices are describing, since they include all the motions somewhere.

The interpretation of the state vector, whose components are written ψ_{m}, was furnished by Born. This interpretation is statistical: the result of a measurement of the physical quantity corresponding to the matrix A is random, with an average value equal to
$$\sum_{mn} \psi_m^* A_{mn} \psi_n \,.$$
Alternatively, and equivalently, the state vector gives the probability amplitude ψ_{n} for the quantum system to be in the energy state n.

Once the state vector was introduced, matrix mechanics could be rotated to any basis, where the H matrix need no longer be diagonal. The Heisenberg equation of motion in its original form states that A_{mn} evolves in time like a Fourier component,
$$A_{mn}(t) = e^{i(E_m - E_n)t} A_{mn} (0) ~,$$
which can be recast in differential form
$$\frac{dA_{mn}}{dt} = i(E_m - E_n ) A_{mn} ~,$$
and it can be restated so that it is true in an arbitrary basis, by noting that the H matrix is diagonal with diagonal values E_{m},
$$\frac{dA}{dt} = i( H A - A H ) ~ .$$
This is now a matrix equation, so it holds in any basis. This is the modern form of the Heisenberg equation of motion.

Its formal solution is:
$$A(t) = e^{iHt} A(0) e^{-iHt} ~.$$

All these forms of the equation of motion above say the same thing, that A(t) is equivalent to A(0), through a basis rotation by the unitary matrix e^{iHt}, a systematic picture elucidated by Dirac in his bra–ket notation.

Conversely, by rotating the basis for the state vector at each time by e^{iHt}, the time dependence in the matrices can be undone. The matrices are now time independent, but the state vector rotates,
$$| \psi(t) \rangle = e^{-iHt} | \psi(0) \rangle, \qquad \frac{d |\psi \rangle }{dt} = - i H | \psi \rangle \,.$$
This is the Schrödinger equation for the state vector, and this time-dependent change of basis amounts to transformation to the Schrödinger picture, with ⟨x|ψ⟩ = ψ(x).

In quantum mechanics in the Heisenberg picture the state vector, |ψ⟩ does not change with time, while an observable A satisfies the Heisenberg equation of motion,

$\frac{dA}{dt} = \frac{i}{\hbar } [ H , A ] + \frac{\partial A}{\partial t}~.$

The extra term is for operators such as
$$A = \left(X + t^2 P\right)$$
which have an explicit time dependence, in addition to the time dependence from the unitary evolution discussed.

The Heisenberg picture does not distinguish time from space, so it is better suited to relativistic theories than the Schrödinger equation. Moreover, the similarity to classical physics is more manifest: the Hamiltonian equations of motion for classical mechanics are recovered by replacing the commutator above by the Poisson bracket (see also below). By the Stone–von Neumann theorem, the Heisenberg picture and the Schrödinger picture must be unitarily equivalent, as detailed below.

== Further results ==
Matrix mechanics rapidly developed into modern quantum mechanics, and gave interesting physical results on the spectra of atoms.

=== Wave mechanics ===
Jordan noted that the commutation relations ensure that P acts as a differential operator.

The operator identity
$$[a,bc] = abc - bca = abc - bac + bac - bca = [a,b]c + b[a,c]$$
allows the evaluation of the commutator of P with any power of X, and it implies that
$$\left[ P,X^n \right] = - i n~ X^{n-1}$$
which, together with linearity, implies that a P-commutator effectively differentiates any analytic matrix function of X.

Assuming limits are defined sensibly, this extends to arbitrary functions−but the extension need not be made explicit until a certain degree of mathematical rigor is required,

$[P,f(X)] = -i f'(X)\, .$

Since X is a Hermitian matrix, it should be diagonalizable, and it will be clear from the eventual form of P that every real number can be an eigenvalue. This makes some of the mathematics subtle, since there is a separate eigenvector for every point in space.

In the basis where X is diagonal, an arbitrary state can be written as a superposition of states with eigenvalues x,
$$|\psi\rangle = \int_x \psi(x)|x\rangle \,,$$
so that ψ(x) = ⟨x|ψ⟩, and the operator X multiplies each eigenvector by x,
$$X |\psi\rangle = \int_x x \psi(x) |x\rangle ~ .$$

Define a linear operator D which differentiates ψ,
$$D \int_x \psi(x) | x\rangle = \int_x \psi'(x) |x\rangle\,,$$
and note that
$$(D X - X D) |\psi\rangle = \int_x \left[ \left(x \psi(x)\right)' - x \psi'(x) \right] |x\rangle = \int_x \psi(x) |x\rangle = |\psi\rangle\,,$$
so that the operator −iD obeys the same commutation relation as P. Thus, the difference between P and −iD must commute with X,
$$[P+iD,X]=0\,,$$
so it may be simultaneously diagonalized with X: its value acting on any eigenstate of X is some function f of the eigenvalue x.

This function must be real, because both P and −iD are Hermitian,
$$(P+iD ) |x\rangle = f(x) |x\rangle\,,$$
rotating each state |x⟩ by a phase f(x), that is, redefining the phase of the wavefunction:
$$\psi(x) \rightarrow e^{-if(x)} \psi(x)\,.$$
The operator iD is redefined by an amount:
$$iD \rightarrow iD + f(X)\,,$$
which means that, in the rotated basis, P is equal to −iD.

Hence, there is always a basis for the eigenvalues of X where the action of P on any wavefunction is known:
$$P \int_x \psi(x) |x\rangle = \int_x - i \psi'(x) |x\rangle\,,$$
and the Hamiltonian in this basis is a linear differential operator on the state-vector components,
$$\left[\frac{P^2}{2m} + V(X) \right] \int_x \psi_x |x\rangle = \int_x \left[-\frac 1{2m}\frac{\partial^2}{\partial x^2} + V(x)\right] \psi_x |x\rangle$$

Thus, the equation of motion for the state vector is but a celebrated differential equation,

$i\frac{\partial}{\partial t} \psi_t(x) = \left[-\frac 1{2m} \frac{\partial^2}{\partial x^2} + V(x)\right] \psi_t(x)\, .$

Since D is a differential operator, in order for it to be sensibly defined, there must be eigenvalues of X which neighbors every given value. This suggests that the only possibility is that the space of all eigenvalues of X is all real numbers, and that P is iD, up to a phase rotation.

To make this rigorous requires a sensible discussion of the limiting space of functions, and in this space this is the Stone–von Neumann theorem: any operators X and P which obey the commutation relations can be made to act on a space of wavefunctions, with P a derivative operator. This implies that a Schrödinger picture is always available.

Matrix mechanics easily extends to many degrees of freedom in a natural way. Each degree of freedom has a separate X operator and a separate effective differential operator P, and the wavefunction is a function of all the possible eigenvalues of the independent commuting X variables.
$$\begin{align}
\left[X_i, X_j\right] &= 0 \\[1ex]
\left[P_i, P_j\right] &= 0 \\[1ex]
\left[X_i, P_j\right] &= i\delta_{ij} \, .
\end{align}$$

In particular, this means that a system of N interacting particles in 3 dimensions is described by one vector whose components in a basis where all the X are diagonal is a mathematical function of 3N-dimensional space describing all their possible positions, effectively a much bigger collection of values than the mere collection of N three-dimensional wavefunctions in one physical space. Schrödinger came to the same conclusion independently, and eventually proved the equivalence of his own formalism to Heisenberg's.

Since the wavefunction is a property of the whole system, not of any one part, the description in quantum mechanics is not entirely local. The description of several quantum particles has them correlated, or entangled. This entanglement leads to strange correlations between distant particles which violate the classical Bell's inequality.

Even if the particles can only be in just two positions, the wavefunction for N particles requires 2^{N} complex numbers, one for each total configuration of positions. This is exponentially many numbers in N, so simulating quantum mechanics on a computer requires exponential resources. Conversely, this suggests that it might be possible to find quantum systems of size N which physically compute the answers to problems which classically require 2^{N} bits to solve. This is the aspiration behind quantum computing.

=== Ehrenfest theorem ===
For the time-independent operators X and P, ∂A/∂t = 0 so the Heisenberg equation above reduces to:
$$i\hbar\frac{dA}{dt} = [A,H]= AH - HA,$$
where the square brackets [ , ] denote the commutator. For a Hamiltonian which is p^{2}/2m + V(x), the X and P operators satisfy:
$$\frac{d X}{dt} = \frac{P}{m},\quad \frac{d P}{dt} = - \nabla V ,$$
where the first is classically the velocity, and second is classically the force, or potential gradient. These reproduce Hamilton's form of Newton's laws of motion. In the Heisenberg picture, the X and P operators satisfy the classical equations of motion. You can take the expectation value of both sides of the equation to see that, in any state |ψ⟩:
$$\begin{align}
\frac{d}{dt} \langle X\rangle &= \frac{d}{dt} \langle \psi|X|\psi \rangle = \frac{1}{m} \langle \psi|P|\psi \rangle = \frac{1}{m} \langle P \rangle \\[1.5ex]
\frac{d}{dt} \langle P\rangle &= \frac{d}{dt} \langle \psi|P|\psi \rangle = \langle \psi | (-\nabla V) |\psi\rangle = -\langle\nabla V\rangle \, .
\end{align}$$

So Newton's laws are exactly obeyed by the expected values of the operators in any given state. This is Ehrenfest's theorem, which is an obvious corollary of the Heisenberg equations of motion, but is less trivial in the Schrödinger picture, where Ehrenfest discovered it.

=== Transformation theory ===
In classical mechanics, a canonical transformation of phase space coordinates is one which preserves the structure of the Poisson brackets. The new variables x′, p′ have the same Poisson brackets with each other as the original variables x, p. Time evolution is a canonical transformation, since the phase space at any time is just as good a choice of variables as the phase space at any other time.

The Hamiltonian flow is the canonical transformation:
$$\begin{align}
x &\rightarrow x+dx = x + \frac{\partial H}{\partial p} dt \\[1ex]
p &\rightarrow p+dp = p - \frac{\partial H}{\partial x} dt ~.
\end{align}$$

Since the Hamiltonian can be an arbitrary function of x and p, there are such infinitesimal canonical transformations corresponding to every classical quantity G, where G serves as the Hamiltonian to generate a flow of points in phase space for an increment of time s,
$$\begin{align}
dx &= \frac{\partial G}{\partial p} ds = \left\{ G, X \right\} ds \\[1ex]
dp &= -\frac{\partial G}{\partial x} ds = \left\{ G, P \right\} ds \, .
\end{align}$$

For a general function A(x,p) on phase space, its infinitesimal change at every step ds under this map is
$$dA = \frac{\partial A}{\partial x} dx + \frac{\partial A}{\partial p} dp = \{ A,G\} ds \, .$$
The quantity G is called the infinitesimal generator of the canonical transformation.

In quantum mechanics, the quantum analog G is now a Hermitian matrix, and the equations of motion are given by commutators,
$$dA = i [G,A] ds \, .$$

The infinitesimal canonical motions can be formally integrated, just as the Heisenberg equation of motion were integrated,
$$A' = U^{\dagger} A U$$
where U = e^{iGs} and s is an arbitrary parameter.

The definition of a quantum canonical transformation is thus an arbitrary unitary change of basis on the space of all state vectors. U is an arbitrary unitary matrix, a complex rotation in phase space,
$$U^{\dagger} = U^{-1} \, .$$
These transformations leave the sum of the absolute square of the wavefunction components invariant, while they take states which are multiples of each other (including states which are imaginary multiples of each other) to states which are the same multiple of each other.

The interpretation of the matrices is that they act as generators of motions on the space of states.

For example, the motion generated by P can be found by solving the Heisenberg equation of motion using P as a Hamiltonian,
$$\begin{align}
dX &= i[X,P] ds = ds \\[1ex]
dP &= i[P,P] ds = 0 \, .
\end{align}$$
These are translations of the matrix X by a multiple of the identity matrix,
$$X\rightarrow X+s I ~.$$
This is the interpretation of the derivative operator D: e^{iPs} = e^{D}, the exponential of a derivative operator is a translation (so Lagrange's shift operator).

The X operator likewise generates translations in P. The Hamiltonian generates translations in time, the angular momentum generates rotations in physical space, and the operator X^{2} + P^{2} generates rotations in phase space.

When a transformation, like a rotation in physical space, commutes with the Hamiltonian, the transformation is called a symmetry (behind a degeneracy) of the Hamiltonian – the Hamiltonian expressed in terms of rotated coordinates is the same as the original Hamiltonian. This means that the change in the Hamiltonian under the infinitesimal symmetry generator L vanishes,
$$\frac{dH}{ds} = i[L,H] = 0\, .$$

It then follows that the change in the generator under time translation also vanishes,
$$\frac{dL}{dt} = i[H,L] = 0$$
so that the matrix L is constant in time: it is conserved.

The one-to-one association of infinitesimal symmetry generators and conservation laws was discovered by Emmy Noether for classical mechanics, where the commutators are Poisson brackets, but the quantum-mechanical reasoning is identical. In quantum mechanics, any unitary symmetry transformation yields a conservation law, since if the matrix U has the property that
$$U^{-1} H U = H$$
so it follows that
$$UH = HU$$
and that the time derivative of U is zero – it is conserved.

The eigenvalues of unitary matrices are pure phases, so that the value of a unitary conserved quantity is a complex number of unit magnitude, not a real number. Another way of saying this is that a unitary matrix is the exponential of i times a Hermitian matrix, so that the additive conserved real quantity, the phase, is only well-defined up to an integer multiple of 2π. Only when the unitary symmetry matrix is part of a family that comes arbitrarily close to the identity are the conserved real quantities single-valued, and then the demand that they are conserved become a much more exacting constraint.

Symmetries which can be continuously connected to the identity are called continuous, and translations, rotations, and boosts are examples. Symmetries which cannot be continuously connected to the identity are discrete, and the operation of space-inversion, or parity, and charge conjugation are examples.

The interpretation of the matrices as generators of canonical transformations is due to Paul Dirac. The correspondence between symmetries and matrices was shown by Eugene Wigner to be complete, if antiunitary matrices which describe symmetries which include time-reversal are included.

=== Selection rules ===
It was physically clear to Heisenberg that the absolute squares of the matrix elements of X, which are the Fourier coefficients of the oscillation, would yield the rate of emission of electromagnetic radiation.

In the classical limit of large orbits, if a charge with position X(t) and charge q is oscillating next to an equal and opposite charge at position 0, the instantaneous dipole moment is q X(t), and the time variation of this moment translates directly into the space-time variation of the vector potential, which yields nested outgoing spherical waves.

For atoms, the wavelength of the emitted light is about 10,000 times the atomic radius, and the dipole moment is the only contribution to the radiative field, while all other details of the atomic charge distribution can be ignored.

Ignoring back-reaction, the power radiated in each outgoing mode is a sum of separate contributions from the square of each independent time Fourier mode of d,
$$P(\omega) = \tfrac23 {\omega^4} |d_i|^2 ~.$$

Now, in Heisenberg's representation, the Fourier coefficients of the dipole moment are the matrix elements of X. This correspondence allowed Heisenberg to provide the rule for the transition intensities, the fraction of the time that, starting from an initial state i, a photon is emitted and the atom jumps to a final state j,
$$P_{ij} = \tfrac23 \left(E_i -E_j\right)^4 \left|X_{ij}\right|^2\, .$$

This then allowed the magnitude of the matrix elements to be interpreted statistically: they give the intensity of the spectral lines, the probability for quantum jumps from the emission of dipole radiation.

Since the transition rates are given by the matrix elements of X, wherever X_{ij} is zero, the corresponding transition should be absent. These were called the selection rules, which were a puzzle until the advent of matrix mechanics.

An arbitrary state of the hydrogen atom, ignoring spin, is labelled by |n;l,m⟩, where the value of l is a measure of the total orbital angular momentum and m is its z-component, which defines the orbit orientation. The components of the angular momentum pseudovector are
$$L_i = \varepsilon_{ijk} X^j P^k$$
where the products in this expression are independent of order and real, because different components of X and P commute.

The commutation relations of L with all three coordinate matrices X, Y, Z (or with any vector) are easy to find,
$$\left[L_i, X_j\right] = i\varepsilon_{ijk} X_k\,,$$
which confirms that the operator L generates rotations between the three components of the vector of coordinate matrices X.

From this, the commutator of L_{z} and the coordinate matrices X, Y, Z can be read off,
$$\begin{align}
\left[L_z, X\right] &= iY\,, \\[1ex]
\left[L_z, Y\right] &= -iX\,.
\end{align}$$

This means that the quantities X + iY and X − iY have a simple commutation rule,
$$\begin{align}
\left[L_z, X + iY\right] &= (X + iY)\,, \\[1ex]
\left[L_z, X - iY\right] &= -(X - iY)\,.
\end{align}$$

Just like the matrix elements of X + iP and X − iP for the harmonic oscillator Hamiltonian, this commutation law implies that these operators only have certain off diagonal matrix elements in states of definite m,
$$L_z \bigl( (X+iY)|m\rangle \bigr)= (X+iY)L_z|m\rangle + (X+iY) |m\rangle = (m+1) (X+iY)|m\rangle$$
meaning that the matrix (X + iY) takes an eigenvector of L_{z} with eigenvalue m to an eigenvector with eigenvalue m + 1. Similarly, (X − iY) decrease m by one unit, while Z does not change the value of m.

So, in a basis of |l,m⟩ states where L^{2} and L_{z} have definite values, the matrix elements of any of the three components of the position are zero, except when m is the same or changes by one unit.

This places a constraint on the change in total angular momentum. Any state can be rotated so that its angular momentum is in the z-direction as much as possible, where m = l. The matrix element of the position acting on |l,m⟩ can only produce values of m which are bigger by one unit, so that if the coordinates are rotated so that the final state is |l′,l′⟩, the value of l′ can be at most one bigger than the biggest value of l that occurs in the initial state. So l′ is at most l + 1.

The matrix elements vanish for l′ > l + 1, and the reverse matrix element is determined by Hermiticity, so these vanish also when l′ < l − 1: Dipole transitions are forbidden with a change in angular momentum of more than one unit.

=== Sum rules ===
The Heisenberg equation of motion determines the matrix elements of P in the Heisenberg basis from the matrix elements of X.
$$P_{ij} = m\frac{d}{dt} X_{ij} = im \left(E_i - E_j\right) X_{ij} \,,$$
which turns the diagonal part of the commutation relation into a sum rule for the magnitude of the matrix elements:
$$\sum_j P_{ij}x_{ji} - X_{ij}p_{ji} = i \sum_j 2m \left(E_i - E_j\right) \left|X_{ij}\right|^2 = i \,.$$

This yields a relation for the sum of the spectroscopic intensities to and from any given state, although to be absolutely correct, contributions from the radiative capture probability for unbound scattering states must be included in the sum:
$$\sum_j 2m\left(E_i - E_j\right) \left|X_{ij}\right|^2 = 1\,.$$

== See also ==
- Interaction picture
- Bra–ket notation
- Introduction to quantum mechanics
- Heisenberg's entryway to matrix mechanics
