= Heisenberg group =

Group in group theory and physics

In mathematics, the Heisenberg group $H$, named after Werner Heisenberg, is the group of 3×3 upper triangular matrices of the form

$$\begin{pmatrix}
1 & a & c\\
0 & 1 & b\\
0 & 0 & 1\\
\end{pmatrix}$$

under the operation of matrix multiplication. Elements a, b and c can be taken from any commutative ring with identity, often taken to be the ring of real numbers (resulting in the "continuous Heisenberg group") or the ring of integers (resulting in the "discrete Heisenberg group").

The continuous Heisenberg group arises in the description of one-dimensional quantum mechanical systems, especially in the context of the Stone–von Neumann theorem. More generally, one can consider Heisenberg groups associated to n-dimensional systems, and most generally, to any symplectic vector space.

== Three-dimensional case ==
In the three-dimensional case, the product of two Heisenberg matrices is given by

$$\begin{pmatrix}
1 & a & c\\
0 & 1 & b\\
0 & 0 & 1\\
\end{pmatrix}
\begin{pmatrix}
1 & a' & c'\\
0 & 1 & b'\\
0 & 0 & 1\\
\end{pmatrix}=
\begin{pmatrix}
1 & a+a' & c+ab'+c'\\
0 & 1 & b+b'\\
0 & 0 & 1\\
\end{pmatrix}.$$

As one can see from the term ab′, the group is non-abelian.

The neutral element of the Heisenberg group is the identity matrix, and inverses are given by

$$\begin{pmatrix}
1 & a & c\\
0 & 1 & b\\
0 & 0 & 1\\
\end{pmatrix}^{-1}=
\begin{pmatrix}
1 & -a & ab-c\\
0 & 1 & -b\\
0 & 0 & 1\\
\end{pmatrix}.$$

The group is a subgroup of the 2-dimensional affine group Aff(2): the action of the element
$$\begin{pmatrix}
1 & a & c\\
0 & 1 & b\\
0 & 0 & 1\\
\end{pmatrix}$$
on the vector $(\vec{x}, 1)$ corresponds to the affine transform
$$\begin{pmatrix}
1 & a\\
0 & 1
\end{pmatrix}{\vec x} + \begin{pmatrix}
c\\
b
\end{pmatrix}.$$

There are several prominent examples of the three-dimensional case.

=== Continuous Heisenberg group ===
If a, b, c, are real numbers (in the ring R), then one has the continuous Heisenberg group H_{3}(R).

It is a nilpotent real Lie group of dimension 3.

In addition to the representation as real 3×3 matrices, the continuous Heisenberg group also has several different representations in terms of function spaces. By Stone–von Neumann theorem, there is, up to isomorphism, a unique irreducible unitary representation of H in which its centre acts by a given nontrivial character. This representation has several important realizations, or models. In the Schrödinger model, the Heisenberg group acts on the space of square integrable functions. In the theta, or holomorphic, model, the Heisenberg group acts on a Hilbert space of entire functions, with the model depending on a parameter in the upper half-plane.

=== Discrete Heisenberg group ===
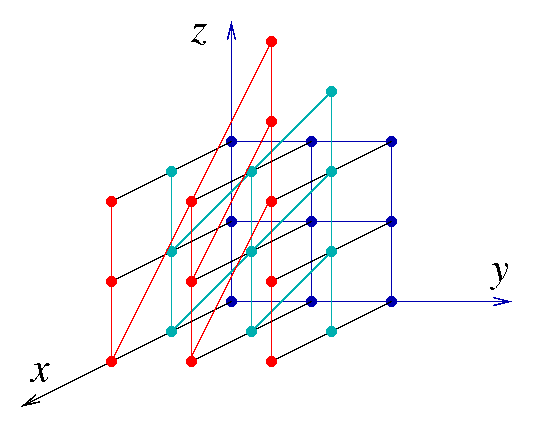
A portion of the Cayley graph of the discrete Heisenberg group, with generators x, y, z as in the text (the coloring is only for visual aid)

If a, b, c are integers (in the ring Z), then one has the discrete Heisenberg group H_{3}(Z). It is a non-abelian nilpotent group. It has two generators:

$$x = \begin{pmatrix}
1 & 1 & 0 \\
0 & 1 & 0 \\
0 & 0 & 1
\end{pmatrix},\quad
y = \begin{pmatrix}
1 & 0 & 0 \\
0 & 1 & 1 \\
0 & 0 & 1
\end{pmatrix}$$

and relations

$$z = xyx^{-1}y^{-1},\quad xz = zx,\quad  yz = zy,$$

where

$$z = \begin{pmatrix}
1 & 0 & 1 \\
0 & 1 & 0 \\
0 & 0 & 1
\end{pmatrix}$$

is the generator of the center of H_{3}. (Note that the inverses of x, y, and z replace the 1 above the diagonal with −1.)

By Bass's theorem, it has a polynomial growth rate of order 4.

One can generate any element through

$$\begin{pmatrix}
1 & a & c \\
0 & 1 & b \\
0 & 0 & 1
\end{pmatrix} = y^b z^c x^a.$$

=== Heisenberg group modulo an odd prime p ===
If one takes a, b, c in Z/p Z for an odd prime p, then one has the Heisenberg group modulo p. It is a group of order p^{3} with generators x, y and relations

$$z = xyx^{-1}y^{-1},\quad x^p = y^p = z^p = 1,\quad xz = zx,\quad yz = zy.$$

Analogues of Heisenberg groups over finite fields of odd prime order p are called extra special groups, or more properly, extra special groups of exponent p. More generally, if the derived subgroup of a group G is contained in the center Z of G, then the map G/Z × G/Z → Z is a skew-symmetric bilinear operator on abelian groups.

However, requiring that G/Z to be a finite vector space requires the Frattini subgroup of G to be contained in the center, and requiring that Z be a one-dimensional vector space over Z/p Z requires that Z have order p, so if G is not abelian, then G is extra special. If G is extra special but does not have exponent p, then the general construction below applied to the symplectic vector space G/Z does not yield a group isomorphic to G.

=== Heisenberg group modulo 2 ===
The Heisenberg group modulo 2 is of order 8 and is isomorphic to the dihedral group D_{4} (the symmetries of a square). Observe that if

$$x = \begin{pmatrix}
1 & 1 & 0 \\
0 & 1 & 0 \\
0 & 0 & 1
\end{pmatrix},\quad
y = \begin{pmatrix}
1 & 0 & 0 \\
0 & 1 & 1 \\
0 & 0 & 1
\end{pmatrix},$$

then

$$xy = \begin{pmatrix}
1 & 1 & 1 \\
0 & 1 & 1 \\
0 & 0 & 1
\end{pmatrix},$$

and

$$yx = \begin{pmatrix}
1 & 1 & 0 \\
0 & 1 & 1 \\
0 & 0 & 1
\end{pmatrix}.$$

The elements x and y correspond to reflections (with 45° between them), whereas xy and yx correspond to rotations by 90°. The other reflections are xyx and yxy, and rotation by 180° is xyxy (= yxyx).

== Heisenberg algebra ==
The Lie algebra $\mathfrak h$ of the Heisenberg group $H$ (over the real numbers) is known as the Heisenberg algebra. It may be represented using the space of 3×3 matrices of the form

$$\begin{pmatrix}
0 & a & c \\
0 & 0 & b \\
0 & 0 & 0
\end{pmatrix}$$

with $a, b, c \in \mathbb R$.

The following three elements form a basis for $\mathfrak h$:

$$X = \begin{pmatrix}
0 & 1 & 0 \\
0 & 0 & 0 \\
0 & 0 & 0
\end{pmatrix},\quad
Y = \begin{pmatrix}
0 & 0 & 0 \\
0 & 0 & 1 \\
0 & 0 & 0
\end{pmatrix},\quad
Z = \begin{pmatrix}
0 & 0 & 1 \\
0 & 0 & 0 \\
0 & 0 & 0
\end{pmatrix}.$$

These basis elements satisfy the commutation relations

$$[X, Y] = Z,\quad [X, Z] = 0,\quad [Y, Z] = 0.$$

The name "Heisenberg group" is motivated by the preceding relations, which have the same form as the canonical commutation relations in quantum mechanics:

$$[\hat x, \hat p] = i\hbar I,\quad [\hat x, i\hbar I] = 0,\quad [\hat p, i\hbar I] = 0,$$

where $\hat x$ is the position operator, $\hat p$ is the momentum operator, and $\hbar$ is the Planck constant.

The Heisenberg group H has the special property that the exponential map is a one-to-one and onto map from the Lie algebra $\mathfrak h$ to the group H:

$$\exp \begin{pmatrix}
0 & a & c \\
0 & 0 & b \\
0 & 0 & 0
\end{pmatrix} = \begin{pmatrix}
1 & a & c + \frac{ab}2 \\
0 & 1 & b \\
0 & 0 & 1
\end{pmatrix}.$$

=== In conformal field theory ===
In conformal field theory, the term Heisenberg algebra is used to refer to an infinite-dimensional generalization of the above algebra. It is spanned by elements $a_n, n \in \mathbb{Z}$ with commutation relations

$$[a_n, a_m] = \delta_{n + m, 0}.$$

Under a rescaling, this is simply a countably-infinite number of copies of the above algebra.

== Higher dimensions ==
More general Heisenberg groups $H_{2n+1}$ may be defined for higher dimensions in Euclidean space, and more generally on symplectic vector spaces. The simplest general case is the real Heisenberg group of dimension $2n + 1$, for any integer $n \geq 1$. As a group of matrices, $H_{2n+1}$ (or $H_{2n+1}(\mathbb R)$ to indicate that this is the Heisenberg group over the field $\mathbb R$ of real numbers) is defined as the group $(n + 2) \times (n + 2)$ matrices with entries in $\mathbb R$ and having the form

$$\begin{bmatrix}
1 & \mathbf a & c \\
\mathbf 0 & I_n & \mathbf b \\
0 & \mathbf 0 & 1
\end{bmatrix},$$

where

a is a row vector of length n,
b is a column vector of length n,
I_{n} is the identity matrix of size n.

=== Group structure ===
This is indeed a group, as is shown by the multiplication:

$$\begin{bmatrix}
1 & \mathbf a & c \\
\mathbf 0 & I_n & \mathbf b \\
0 & \mathbf 0 & 1
\end{bmatrix} \cdot \begin{bmatrix}
1 & \mathbf a' & c' \\
\mathbf 0 & I_n & \mathbf b' \\
0 & \mathbf 0 & 1
\end{bmatrix} = \begin{bmatrix}
1 & \mathbf a + \mathbf a' & c + c' + \mathbf a \cdot \mathbf b' \\
\mathbf 0 & I_n & \mathbf b + \mathbf b' \\
0 & \mathbf 0 & 1
\end{bmatrix}$$

and

$$\begin{bmatrix}
1 & \mathbf a & c \\
\mathbf 0 & I_n & \mathbf b \\
0 & \mathbf 0 & 1
\end{bmatrix} \cdot \begin{bmatrix}
1 & -\mathbf a & -c + \mathbf a \cdot \mathbf b \\
\mathbf 0 & I_n & -\mathbf b \\
0 & \mathbf 0 & 1
\end{bmatrix} = \begin{bmatrix}
1 & \mathbf 0 & 0 \\
\mathbf 0 & I_n & \mathbf 0 \\
0 & \mathbf 0 & 1
\end{bmatrix}.$$

=== Lie algebra ===
The Heisenberg group is a simply-connected Lie group whose Lie algebra consists of matrices

$$\begin{bmatrix}
0 & \mathbf a & c \\
\mathbf 0 & 0_n & \mathbf b \\
0 & \mathbf 0 & 0
\end{bmatrix},$$

where

a is a row vector of length n,
b is a column vector of length n,
0_{n} is the zero matrix of size n.

By letting e_{1}, ..., e_{n} be the canonical basis of R^{n} and setting

$$p_i = \begin{bmatrix}
0 & \operatorname{e}_i^\mathrm{T} & 0 \\
\mathbf 0 & 0_n & \mathbf 0 \\
0 & \mathbf 0 & 0
\end{bmatrix},\quad
q_j = \begin{bmatrix}
0 & \mathbf 0 & 0 \\
\mathbf 0 & 0_n & \operatorname{e}_j \\
0 & \mathbf 0 & 0
\end{bmatrix},\quad
z = \begin{bmatrix}
0 & \mathbf 0  & 1 \\
\mathbf 0 & 0_n & \mathbf 0 \\
0 & \mathbf 0 & 0
\end{bmatrix},$$

the associated Lie algebra can be characterized by the canonical commutation relations

$$\begin{bmatrix} p_i, q_j \end{bmatrix} = \delta_{ij}z,\quad \begin{bmatrix} p_i, z \end{bmatrix} = 0,\quad \begin{bmatrix}  q_j, z \end{bmatrix} = 0,$$	1

where p_{1}, ..., p_{n}, q_{1}, ..., q_{n}, z are the algebra generators.

In particular, z is a central element of the Heisenberg Lie algebra. Note that the Lie algebra of the Heisenberg group is nilpotent.

=== Exponential map ===
Let

$$u = \begin{bmatrix}
0 & \mathbf a & c \\
\mathbf 0 & 0_n & \mathbf b \\
0 & \mathbf 0 & 0
\end{bmatrix},$$

which fulfills $u^3 = 0_{n+2}$. The exponential map evaluates to

$$\exp(u) = \sum_{k=0}^\infty \frac{1}{k!} u^k = I_{n+2} + u + \tfrac{1}{2}u^2 =
\begin{bmatrix}
1 & \mathbf a & c + \frac{1}{2} \mathbf a \cdot \mathbf b \\
\mathbf 0 & I_n & \mathbf b \\
0 & \mathbf 0 & 1
\end{bmatrix}.$$

The exponential map of any nilpotent Lie algebra is a diffeomorphism between the Lie algebra and the unique associated connected, simply-connected Lie group.

This discussion (aside from statements referring to dimension and Lie group) further applies if we replace R by any commutative ring A. The corresponding group is denoted H_{n}(A).

Under the additional assumption that the prime 2 is invertible in the ring A, the exponential map is also defined, since it reduces to a finite sum and has the form above (e.g. A could be a ring Z/p Z with an odd prime p or any field of characteristic 0).

== Representation theory ==
The unitary representation theory of the Heisenberg group is fairly simple – later generalized by Mackey theory – and was the motivation for its introduction in quantum physics, as discussed below.

For each nonzero real number $\hbar$, we can define an irreducible unitary representation $\Pi_\hbar$ of $H_{2n+1}$ acting on the Hilbert space $L^2(\mathbb R^n)$ by the formula

$$\left[\Pi_\hbar \begin{pmatrix}
1 & \mathbf a & c \\
0 & I_n & \mathbf b \\
0 & 0 & 1
\end{pmatrix} \psi\right](\mathbf x) = e^{i\hbar c} e^{i \mathbf b\cdot \mathbf x} \psi(\mathbf x + \hbar \mathbf a).$$

This representation is known as the Schrödinger representation. The motivation for this representation is the action of the exponentiated position and momentum operators in quantum mechanics. The parameter $a$ describes translations in position space, the parameter $b$ describes translations in momentum space, and the parameter $c$ gives an overall phase factor. The phase factor is needed to obtain a group of operators, since translations in position space and translations in momentum space do not commute.

The key result is the Stone–von Neumann theorem, which states that every (strongly continuous) irreducible unitary representation of the Heisenberg group in which the center acts nontrivially is equivalent to $\Pi_\hbar$ for some $\hbar$. Alternatively, that they are all equivalent to the Weyl algebra (or CCR algebra) on a symplectic space of dimension 2n.

Since the Heisenberg group is a one-dimensional central extension of $\mathbb R^{2n}$, its irreducible unitary representations can be viewed as irreducible unitary projective representations of $\mathbb R^{2n}$. Conceptually, the representation given above constitutes the quantum-mechanical counterpart to the group of translational symmetries on the classical phase space, $\mathbb R^{2n}$. The fact that the quantum version is only a projective representation of $\mathbb R^{2n}$ is suggested already at the classical level. The Hamiltonian generators of translations in phase space are the position and momentum functions. The span of these functions does not form a Lie algebra under the Poisson bracket, however, because $\{x_i, p_j\} = \delta_{i,j}.$ Rather, the span of the position and momentum functions and the constants forms a Lie algebra under the Poisson bracket. This Lie algebra is a one-dimensional central extension of the commutative Lie algebra $\mathbb R^{2n}$, isomorphic to the Lie algebra of the Heisenberg group.

=== Plancherel theorem ===
The Plancherel theorem for the Heisenberg group describes the decomposition of $L^2(H_n)$ under the noncommutative Fourier transform. Unlike the Fourier transform on an abelian group, the group Fourier transform of a function on $H_n$ is generally operator-valued.

Let $\pi_\lambda$ denote the Schrödinger representation of $H_n$ with nontrivial central character $\lambda\in\mathbb R\setminus\{0\}$. For a sufficiently nice function $f$, for example $f\in L^1(H_n)\cap L^2(H_n)$, its group Fourier transform is the operator

$$\widehat f(\lambda)
=
\int_{H_n} f(g)\,\pi_\lambda(g)^\ast\,dg,
\qquad \lambda\neq 0.$$

Here $dg$ denotes Haar measure on $H_n$, which in exponential coordinates is ordinary Lebesgue measure.

With a common normalization of Haar measure and of the Schrödinger representations, the Plancherel formula is

$$\|f\|_{L^2(H_n)}^2
=
(2\pi)^{-(n+1)}
\int_{\mathbb R\setminus\{0\}}
\|\widehat f(\lambda)\|_{\mathrm{HS}}^2
|\lambda|^n\,d\lambda,$$

where $\|\cdot\|_{\mathrm{HS}}$ is the Hilbert–Schmidt norm. Equivalently, the Fourier transform extends from $L^1(H_n)\cap L^2(H_n)$ to a unitary map from $L^2(H_n)$ onto the direct integral of Hilbert–Schmidt operator spaces

$$\int_{\mathbb R\setminus\{0\}}^{\oplus}
\mathrm{HS}\bigl(L^2(\mathbb R^n)\bigr)
\,|\lambda|^n\,d\lambda,$$

up to the same normalizing constant.

For suitable functions, the corresponding Fourier inversion formula is

$$f(g)
=
(2\pi)^{-(n+1)}
\int_{\mathbb R\setminus\{0\}}
\operatorname{tr}\!\left(\pi_\lambda(g)\widehat f(\lambda)\right)
|\lambda|^n\,d\lambda.$$

The one-dimensional unitary representations of $H_n$, which factor through the abelian quotient $H_n/Z(H_n)$, do not appear in the Plancherel formula. Thus the Plancherel measure of the Heisenberg group is concentrated on the infinite-dimensional Schrödinger representations with nonzero central character.

The Plancherel theorem describes how the representations classified by the Stone–von Neumann theorem occur in the regular representation of $H_n$ on $L^2(H_n)$.

== On symplectic vector spaces ==
The general abstraction of a Heisenberg group is constructed from any symplectic vector space. For example, let (V, ω) be a finite-dimensional real symplectic vector space (so ω is a nondegenerate skew symmetric bilinear form on V). The Heisenberg group H(V) on (V, ω) (or simply V for brevity) is the set V×R endowed with the group law

$$(v, t)  \cdot \left(v', t'\right) = \left(v + v', t + t' + \frac{1}{2}\omega\left(v, v'\right)\right).$$

The Heisenberg group is a central extension of the additive group V. Thus there is an exact sequence

$$0 \to \mathbf{R} \to H(V) \to V \to 0.$$

Any symplectic vector space admits a Darboux basis {e_{j}, f^{k}}_{1 ≤ j,k ≤ n} satisfying ω(e_{j}, f^{k}) = δ_{j}^{k} and where 2n is the dimension of V (the dimension of V is necessarily even). In terms of this basis, every vector decomposes as

$$v = q^a\mathbf{e}_a + p_a\mathbf{f}^a.$$

The q^{a} and p_{a} are canonically conjugate coordinates.

If {e_{j}, f^{k}}_{1 ≤ j,k ≤ n} is a Darboux basis for V, then let {E} be a basis for R, and {e_{j}, f^{k}, E}_{1 ≤ j,k ≤ n} is the corresponding basis for V×R. A vector in H(V) is then given by

$$v = q^a\mathbf{e}_a + p_a\mathbf{f}^a + tE$$

and the group law becomes

$$(p, q, t)\cdot\left(p', q', t'\right) = \left(p + p', q + q', t + t' + \frac{1}{2}(pq' - p'q)\right).$$

Because the underlying manifold of the Heisenberg group is a linear space, vectors in the Lie algebra can be canonically identified with vectors in the group. The Lie algebra of the Heisenberg group is given by the commutation relation

$$\begin{bmatrix} (v_1, t_1), (v_2, t_2) \end{bmatrix} = \omega(v_1, v_2)$$

or written in terms of the Darboux basis

$$\left[\mathbf{e}_a, \mathbf{f}^b\right] = \delta_a^b$$

and all other commutators vanish.

It is also possible to define the group law in a different way but which yields a group isomorphic to the group we have just defined. To avoid confusion, we will use u instead of t, so a vector is given by

$$v = q^a\mathbf{e}_a + p_a\mathbf{f}^a + uE$$

and the group law is

$$(p, q, u) \cdot \left(p', q', u'\right) = \left(p + p', q + q', u + u' + pq'\right).$$

An element of the group

$$v = q^a\mathbf{e}_a + p_a\mathbf{f}^a + uE$$

can then be expressed as a matrix

$$\begin{bmatrix}
1 & p   & u \\
0 & I_n & q \\
0 & 0   & 1
\end{bmatrix}$$,

which gives a faithful matrix representation of H(V). The u in this formulation is related to t in our previous formulation by $u = t + \tfrac{1}{2}pq$, so that the t value for the product comes to

$$\begin{align}
&u + u' + pq' - \frac{1}{2}\left(p + p'\right)\left(q + q'\right) \\
={} &t + \frac{1}{2}pq + t' + \frac{1}{2}p'q' + pq' - \frac{1}{2}\left(p + p'\right)\left(q + q'\right) \\
={} &t + t' + \frac{1}{2}\left(pq' - p'q\right)
\end{align}$$,

as before.

The isomorphism to the group using upper triangular matrices relies on the decomposition of V into a Darboux basis, which amounts to a choice of isomorphism V ≅ U ⊕ U*. Although the new group law yields a group isomorphic to the one given higher up, the group with this law is sometimes referred to as the polarized Heisenberg group as a reminder that this group law relies on a choice of basis (a choice of a Lagrangian subspace of V is a polarization).

To any Lie algebra, there is a unique connected, simply connected Lie group G. All other connected Lie groups with the same Lie algebra as G are of the form G/N where N is a central discrete group in G. In this case, the center of H(V) is R and the only discrete subgroups are isomorphic to Z. Thus H(V)/Z is another Lie group which shares this Lie algebra. Of note about this Lie group is that it admits no faithful finite-dimensional representations; it is not isomorphic to any matrix group. It does however have a well-known family of infinite-dimensional unitary representations.

== Connection with the Weyl algebra ==
The Lie algebra $\mathfrak{h}_n$ of the Heisenberg group was described above, (1), as a Lie algebra of matrices. The Poincaré–Birkhoff–Witt theorem applies to determine the universal enveloping algebra $U(\mathfrak{h}_n)$. Among other properties, the universal enveloping algebra is an associative algebra into which $\mathfrak{h}_n$ injectively imbeds.

By the Poincaré–Birkhoff–Witt theorem, it is thus the free vector space generated by the monomials

$$z^j p_1^{k_1} p_2^{k_2} \cdots p_n^{k_n} q_1^{\ell_1} q_2^{\ell_2} \cdots q_n^{\ell_n} ~,$$

where the exponents are all non-negative.

Consequently, $U(\mathfrak{h}_n)$ consists of real polynomials

$$\sum_{j, \vec{k}, \vec{\ell}} c_{j \vec{k} \vec{\ell}} \,\, z^j p_1^{k_1} p_2^{k_2} \cdots p_n^{k_n} q_1^{\ell_1} q_2^{\ell_2} \cdots q_n^{\ell_n}   ~,$$

with the commutation relations

$$p_k p_\ell = p_\ell p_k, \quad q_k q_\ell = q_\ell q_k, \quad p_k q_\ell - q_\ell p_k = \delta_{k \ell} z, \quad z p_k - p_k z =0, \quad z q_k - q_k z =0~.$$

The algebra $U(\mathfrak{h}_n)$ is closely related to the algebra of differential operators on $\mathbb{R}^{n}$ with polynomial coefficients, since any such operator has a unique representation in the form

$$P=\sum_{\vec{k}, \vec{\ell}} c_{\vec{k} \vec{\ell}} \,\, \partial_{x_1}^{k_1} \partial_{x_2}^{k_2} \cdots \partial_{x_n}^{k_n} x_1^{\ell_1} x_2^{\ell_2} \cdots x_n^{\ell_n}  ~.$$

This algebra is called the Weyl algebra. It follows from abstract nonsense that the Weyl algebra W_{n} is a quotient of $U(\mathfrak{h}_n)$. However, this is also easy to see directly from the above representations; viz. by the mapping

$$z^j p_1^{k_1} p_2^{k_2} \cdots p_n^{k_n} q_1^{\ell_1} q_2^{\ell_2} \cdots q_n^{\ell_n} \, \mapsto \, \partial_{x_1}^{k_1} \partial_{x_2}^{k_2} \cdots \partial_{x_n}^{k_n} x_1^{\ell_1} x_2^{\ell_2} \cdots x_n^{\ell_n}~.$$

== Applications ==
=== Weyl's parameterization of quantum mechanics ===
The application that led Hermann Weyl to an explicit realization of the Heisenberg group was the question of why the Schrödinger picture and Heisenberg picture are physically equivalent. Abstractly, the reason is the Stone–von Neumann theorem: there is a unique unitary representation with given action of the central Lie algebra element z, up to a unitary equivalence: the nontrivial elements of the algebra are all equivalent to the usual position and momentum operators.

Thus, the Schrödinger picture and Heisenberg picture are equivalent – they are just different ways of realizing this essentially unique representation.

=== Theta representation ===
The same uniqueness result was used by David Mumford for discrete Heisenberg groups, in his theory of equations defining abelian varieties. This is a large generalization of the approach used in Jacobi's elliptic functions, which is the case of the modulo 2 Heisenberg group, of order 8. The simplest case is the theta representation of the Heisenberg group, of which the discrete case gives the theta function.

In the simplest case, for $\tau$ in the upper half-plane, the standard Jacobi theta function is

$$\vartheta(z,\tau)=\sum_{n\in\mathbb Z}
\exp(\pi i n^2\tau+2\pi inz).$$

It satisfies the transformation laws

$$\vartheta(z+1,\tau)=\vartheta(z,\tau),\qquad
\vartheta(z+\tau,\tau)=e^{-\pi i\tau-2\pi iz}\vartheta(z,\tau).$$

The Heisenberg group appears because translations of $z$ must be accompanied by scalar factors in order to preserve these transformation laws. Introduce operators on holomorphic functions by

$$(S_bf)(z)=f(z+b),\qquad
(T_af)(z)=e^{\pi ia^2\tau+2\pi iaz}f(z+a\tau).$$

They satisfy

$$S_bT_a=e^{2\pi iab}T_aS_b.$$

Thus translations in the two period directions define a projective representation, and the corresponding central extension is a Heisenberg group. The ordinary theta function is, up to scalar, the unique entire function invariant under the integer subgroup generated by $S_1$ and $T_1$.

=== Fourier analysis ===
The Heisenberg group also occurs in Fourier analysis, where it is used in some formulations of the Stone–von Neumann theorem. In this case, the Heisenberg group can be understood to act on the space of square integrable functions; the result is a representation of the Heisenberg groups sometimes called the Weyl representation.

== As a sub-Riemannian manifold ==
An animation of a geodesic in the Heisenberg group

The three-dimensional Heisenberg group H_{3}(R) on the reals can also be understood to be a smooth manifold, and specifically, a simple example of a sub-Riemannian manifold. Given a point p = (x, y, z) in R^{3}, define a differential 1-form Θ at this point as

$$\Theta_p = dz - \frac{1}{2}\left(xdy - ydx\right).$$

This one-form belongs to the cotangent bundle of R^{3}; that is,

$$\Theta_p: T_p\mathbf{R}^3 \to \mathbf{R}$$

is a map on the tangent bundle. Let

$$H_p = \left\{ v \in T_p\mathbf{R}^3 \mid \Theta_p(v) = 0 \right\}.$$

It can be seen that H is a subbundle of the tangent bundle TR^{3}. A cometric on H is given by projecting vectors to the two-dimensional space spanned by vectors in the x and y direction. That is, given vectors $v = (v_1, v_2, v_3)$ and $w = (w_1, w_2, w_3)$ in TR^{3}, the inner product is given by

$$\langle v, w \rangle = v_1 w_1 + v_2 w_2.$$

The resulting structure turns H into the manifold of the Heisenberg group. An orthonormal frame on the manifold is given by the Lie vector fields

$$\begin{align}
X &= \frac{\partial}{\partial x} - \frac{1}{2} y\frac{\partial}{\partial z}, \\
Y &= \frac{\partial}{\partial y} + \frac{1}{2} x\frac{\partial}{\partial z}, \\
Z &= \frac{\partial}{\partial z},
\end{align}$$

which obey the relations [X, Y] = Z and [X, Z] = [Y, Z] = 0. Being Lie vector fields, these form a left-invariant basis for the group action. The geodesics on the manifold are spirals, projecting down to circles in two dimensions. That is, if

$$\gamma(t) = (x(t), y(t), z(t))$$

is a geodesic curve, then the curve $c(t) = (x(t), y(t))$ is an arc of a circle, and

$$z(t) = \frac{1}{2}\int_c xdy - ydx$$

with the integral limited to the two-dimensional plane. That is, the height of the curve is proportional to the area of the circle subtended by the circular arc, which follows by Green's theorem.

== Sub-Laplacian ==
The Heisenberg group is a basic example in the analysis of hypoelliptic operators. In coordinates $(x,y,t)\in \mathbb R^n\times \mathbb R^n\times \mathbb R$, a standard left-invariant horizontal frame is given by

$$X_j=\frac{\partial}{\partial x_j}-\frac{1}{2}y_j\frac{\partial}{\partial t},
\qquad
Y_j=\frac{\partial}{\partial y_j}+\frac{1}{2}x_j\frac{\partial}{\partial t},
\qquad 1\leq j\leq n,$$

together with the central vector field

$$T=\frac{\partial}{\partial t}.$$

These vector fields satisfy

$$[X_j,Y_k]=\delta_{jk}T,\qquad [X_j,T]=[Y_j,T]=0.$$

Thus the horizontal vector fields $X_j,Y_j$, together with their first commutators, span the whole tangent space. This is the simplest model of the Hörmander bracket condition, and it implies that sums of squares of the horizontal vector fields are hypoelliptic.

The operator $\mathcal L$ is homogeneous of degree two with respect to the natural dilations

$$\delta_r(x,y,t)=(rx,ry,r^2t).$$

These dilations make the Heisenberg group a Carnot group, with stratified Lie algebra

$$\mathfrak h_n=V_1\oplus V_2,\qquad [V_1,V_1]=V_2,\qquad [V_1,V_2]=0,$$

where $V_1$ is spanned by the horizontal vector fields and $V_2$ is the one-dimensional center. The corresponding homogeneous dimension is

$$Q=2n+2,$$

rather than the topological dimension $2n+1$. This distinction is important in the study of heat kernels, Sobolev inequalities, singular integrals and function spaces on the group. It is also the Hausdorff dimension of the associated metric space, intuitively because balls of a given radius squeeze down (quadratically) onto the contact hyperplane as the radius tends to zero.

The sub-Laplacian on the Heisenberg group is the left-invariant differential operator

$$\mathcal L=-\sum_{j=1}^n\left(X_j^2+Y_j^2\right).$$

Unlike the ordinary Laplace operator on Euclidean space, $\mathcal L$ contains no second derivative in the central direction $T$. It is therefore not elliptic as an operator on the full tangent bundle. Nevertheless, it is hypoelliptic because the missing central direction is recovered through the commutators $[X_j,Y_j]$.

The sub-Laplacian refines the decomposition of $L^2(H_n)$ further than the Schrödinger representations, which are indexed by a non-zero real (continuous) parameter $\lambda$. Within each Schrödinger representation, one has

$$d\pi_\lambda(\mathcal L) = -\sum_{j=1}^n\frac{\partial^2}{\partial \xi_j^2}+\lambda^2|\xi|^2$$

where $\xi=(\xi_1,\ldots,\xi_n)$ denotes the coordinate on the representation space $L^2(\mathbb R^n)$ in the Schrödinger model. Consequently, for each fixed $\lambda\neq 0$, the transformed operator has discrete oscillator spectrum

$$(2|\alpha|+n)|\lambda|,\qquad \alpha\in\mathbb N^n,$$

up to normalization conventions.

=== Fundamental solution ===
The sub-Laplacian also has an explicit fundamental solution, analogous to the Euclidean fundamental solution of the ordinary Laplacian. In complex coordinates $(z,\tau)\in\mathbb C^n\times\mathbb R$, Folland showed that, up to normalization conventions, the fundamental solution with pole at the identity has the form

$$G(z,\tau)=c_n\left(|z|^4+\tau^2\right)^{-n/2}.$$

The expression uses the natural homogeneous norm on the Heisenberg group, since $|z|^4+\tau^2$ is homogeneous of degree four under the Heisenberg dilations $\delta_r(z,\tau)=(rz,r^2\tau)$.

=== Brownian motion ===
The sub-Laplacian is the infinitesimal generator of the natural Brownian motion associated with the sub-Riemannian structure on the Heisenberg group. With the sign convention

$$\mathcal L=-\sum_{j=1}^n(X_j^2+Y_j^2),$$

the corresponding heat semigroup is generated by $-\frac{1}{2}\mathcal L$; equivalently, with the opposite sign convention, it is generated by $\frac{1}{2}\sum_j(X_j^2+Y_j^2)$.

In the three-dimensional case, this diffusion can be described explicitly in terms of planar Brownian motion. If $B_t=(B_t^1,B_t^2)$ is standard Brownian motion in $\mathbb R^2$, then the associated Heisenberg Brownian motion is

$$\left(B_t^1,B_t^2,A_t\right),$$

where

$$A_t=\frac{1}{2}\int_0^t
\left(B_s^1\,dB_s^2-B_s^2\,dB_s^1\right)$$

is the Lévy area of the planar Brownian path. Thus the central coordinate records the signed stochastic area swept out by the horizontal Brownian motion.

The transition probabilities of this process are given by the heat kernel of the sub-Laplacian. This provides a probabilistic interpretation of the heat equation on the Heisenberg group and is used in the study of heat kernel estimates, gradient bounds, functional inequalities and couplings for hypoelliptic diffusions.

=== Heat kernel ===
The heat equation associated with the positive sub-Laplacian

$$\mathcal L=-\sum_{j=1}^n(X_j^2+Y_j^2)$$

is

$$\partial_s u=-\mathcal L u.$$

Its fundamental solution is the heat kernel $p_s$, defined by

$$e^{-s\mathcal L}f=f*p_s,
\qquad s>0,$$

where convolution is taken with respect to the Heisenberg group law. In standard coordinates $(x,y,t)\in\mathbb R^n\times\mathbb R^n\times\mathbb R$, one common normalization gives

$$p_s(x,y,t)
=
\frac{1}{s^{n+1}(4\pi)^{n+1}}
\int_0^\infty
\left(\frac{\lambda}{\sinh \lambda}\right)^n
\exp\!\left(
-\frac{\lambda\coth\lambda}{4s}(|x|^2+|y|^2)
\right)
\cos\!\left(\frac{\lambda t}{s}\right)
\,d\lambda .$$

Equivalently,

$$p_s(x,y,t)
=
s^{-(n+1)}
p_1\left(\frac{x}{\sqrt{s}},\frac{y}{\sqrt{s}},\frac{t}{s}\right),$$

reflecting the Heisenberg dilations $\delta_r(x,y,t)=(rx,ry,r^2t)$ and the homogeneous dimension $Q=2n+2$.

== Heisenberg group of a locally compact abelian group ==
It is more generally possible to define the Heisenberg group of a locally compact abelian group K, equipped with a Haar measure. Such a group has a Pontrjagin dual $\hat{K}$, consisting of all continuous $U(1)$-valued characters on K, which is also a locally compact abelian group if endowed with the compact-open topology. The Heisenberg group associated with the locally compact abelian group K is the subgroup of the unitary group of $L^2(K)$ generated by translations from K and multiplications by elements of $\hat{K}$.

In more detail, the Hilbert space $L^2(K)$ consists of square-integrable complex-valued functions $f$ on K. The translations in K form a unitary representation of K as operators on $L^2(K)$:

$$(T_x f)(y) = f(x + y)$$

for $x, y \in K$. So too do the multiplications by characters:

$$(M_\chi f)(y) = \chi(y)f(y)$$

for $\chi\in\hat{K}$. These operators do not commute, and instead satisfy

$$\left(T_x M_\chi T^{-1}_x M_\chi^{-1}f\right)(y) = \overline{\chi(x)}f(y)$$

multiplication by a fixed unit modulus complex number.

So the Heisenberg group $H(K)$ associated with K is a type of central extension of $K\times\hat{K}$, via an exact sequence of groups:

$$1 \to U(1) \to H(K) \to K\times\hat{K} \to 0.$$

More general Heisenberg groups are described by 2-cocyles in the cohomology group $H^2(K, U(1))$. The existence of a duality between $K$ and $\hat{K}$ gives rise to a canonical cocycle, but there are generally others.

The Heisenberg group acts irreducibly on $L^2(K)$. Indeed, the continuous characters separate points so any unitary operator of $L^2(K)$ that commutes with them is an $L^\infty$ multiplier. But commuting with translations implies that the multiplier is constant.

A version of the Stone–von Neumann theorem, proved by George Mackey, holds for the Heisenberg group $H(K)$. The Fourier transform is the unique intertwiner between the representations of $L^2(K)$ and $L^2\left(\hat{K}\right)$. See the discussion at Stone–von Neumann theorem#Relation to the Fourier transform for details.

== See also ==
- Canonical commutation relations
- Wigner–Weyl transform
- Stone–von Neumann theorem
- Projective representation
- Geometrization conjecture
