= System of imprimitivity =

The concept of a system of imprimitivity is used in mathematics, particularly in algebra and analysis, both within the context of the theory of group representations. It was used by George Mackey as the basis for his theory of induced unitary representations of locally compact groups.

The simplest case, and the context in which the idea was first noticed, is that of finite groups (see primitive permutation group). Consider a group G and subgroups H and K, with K contained in H. Then the left cosets of H in G are each the union of left cosets of K. Not only that, but translation (on one side) by any element g of G respects this decomposition. The connection with induced representations is that the permutation representation on cosets is the special case of induced representation, in which a representation is induced from a trivial representation. The structure, combinatorial in this case, respected by translation shows that either K is a maximal subgroup of G, or there is a system of imprimitivity (roughly, a lack of full "mixing"). In order to generalise this to other cases, the concept is re-expressed: first in terms of functions on G constant on K-cosets, and then in terms of projection operators (for example the averaging over K-cosets of elements of the group algebra).

Mackey also used the idea for his explication of quantization theory based on preservation of relativity groups acting on configuration space. This generalized work of Eugene Wigner and others and is often considered to be one of the pioneering ideas in canonical quantization.

== Example ==
To motivate the general definitions, a definition is first formulated, in the case of finite groups and their representations on finite-dimensional vector spaces.

Let G be a finite group and U a representation of G on a finite-dimensional complex vector space H. The action of G on elements of H induces an action of G on the vector subspaces W of H in this way:

$$U_g W = \{ U_g w: w \in W \}.$$

Let X be a set of subspaces of H such that

- the elements of X are permuted by the action of G on subspaces and
- H is the (internal) algebraic direct sum of the elements of X, i.e.,

$$H = \bigoplus_{W \in X} W.$$

Then (U,X) is a system of imprimitivity for G.

Two assertions must hold in the definition above:

- the spaces W for W ∈ X must span H, and
- the spaces W ∈ X must be linearly independent, that is,

$$\sum_{W \in X} c_W v_W = 0, \quad v_W \in W \setminus \{ 0 \}$$

holds only when all the coefficients c_{W} are zero.

If the action of G on the elements of X is transitive, then we say this is a transitive system of imprimitivity.

Let G be a finite group and G_{0} a subgroup of G. A representation U of G is induced from a representation V of G_{0} if and only if there exist the following:

- a transitive system of imprimitivity (U, X) and
- a subspace W_{0} ∈ X

such that G_{0} is the stabilizer subgroup of W under the action of G, i.e.

$$G_0 = \{g \in G: U_g W_0 \subseteq W_0\}.$$

and V is equivalent to the representation of G_{0} on W_{0} given by U_{h} | W_{0} for h ∈ G_{0}. Note that by this definition, induced by is a relation between representations. We would like to show that there is actually a mapping on representations which corresponds to this relation.

For finite groups one can show that a well-defined inducing construction exists on equivalence of representations by considering the character of a representation U defined by

$$\chi_U(g) = \operatorname{tr}(U_g).$$

If a representation U of G is induced from a representation V of G_{0}, then

$$\chi_U(g) = \frac{1}{|G_0|} \sum_{\{ x \in G : {x}^{-1} \,
g \, x \in G_0\}} \chi_V({x}^{-1} \ g \ x), \quad \forall g \in G.$$

Thus the character function χ_{U} (and therefore U itself) is completely determined by χ_{V}.

=== Example ===
Let G be a finite group and consider the space H of complex-valued functions on G. The left regular representation of G on H is defined by

$$[\operatorname{L}_g \psi](h) = \psi(g^{-1} h).$$

Now H can be considered as the algebraic direct sum of the one-dimensional spaces W_{x}, for x ∈ G, where

$$W_x = \{\psi \in H: \psi(g) = 0, \quad \forall g \neq x\}.$$

The spaces W_{x} are permuted by L_{g}.

== Infinite dimensional systems of imprimitivity ==
To generalize the finite dimensional definition given in the preceding section, a suitable replacement for the set X of vector subspaces of H which is permuted by the representation U is needed. As it turns out, a naïve approach based on subspaces of H will not work; for example the translation representation of R on L^{2}(R) has no system of imprimitivity in this sense. The right formulation of direct sum decomposition is formulated in terms of projection-valued measures.

Mackey's original formulation was expressed in terms of a locally compact second countable (lcsc) group G, a standard Borel space X and a Borel group action

$$G \times X \rightarrow X, \quad (g,x) \mapsto g \cdot x.$$

We will refer to this as a standard Borel G-space.

The definitions can be given in a much more general context, but the original setup used by Mackey is still quite general and requires fewer technicalities.

Definition. Let G be a lcsc group acting on a standard Borel space X. A system of imprimitivity based on (G, X) consists of a separable Hilbert space H and a pair consisting of

- A strongly-continuous unitary representation U: g → U_{g} of G on H.
- A projection-valued measure π on the Borel sets of X with values in the projections of H;

which satisfy

$$U_g \pi(A) U_{g^{-1}} = \pi(g \cdot A).$$

=== Example ===
Let X be a standard G space and μ a σ-finite countably additive invariant measure on X. This means

$$\mu(g^{-1} A) = \mu(A) \quad$$

for all g ∈ G and Borel subsets A of G.

Let π(A) be multiplication by the indicator function of A and U_{g} be the operator

$$[U_g \psi] (x) =\psi(g^{-1} x).\quad$$

Then (U, π) is a system of imprimitivity of (G, X) on L^{2}_{μ}(X).

This system of imprimitivity is sometimes called the Koopman system of imprimitivity.

== Homogeneous systems of imprimitivity ==
A system of imprimitivity is homogeneous of multiplicity n, where 1 ≤ n ≤ ω if and only if the corresponding projection-valued measure π on X is homogeneous of multiplicity n. In fact, X breaks up into a countable disjoint family {X_{n}}_{1 ≤ n ≤ ω} of Borel sets such that π is homogeneous of multiplicity n on X_{n}. It is also easy to show X_{n} is G invariant.

Lemma. Any system of imprimitivity is an orthogonal direct sum of homogeneous ones.

It can be shown that if the action of G on X is transitive, then any system of imprimitivity on X is homogeneous. More generally, if the action of G on X is ergodic (meaning that X cannot be reduced by invariant proper Borel sets of X) then any system of imprimitivity on X is homogeneous.

We now discuss how the structure of homogeneous systems of imprimitivity can be expressed in a form which generalizes the Koopman representation given in the example above.

In the following, we assume that μ is a σ-finite measure on a standard Borel G-space X such that the action of G respects the measure class of μ. This condition is weaker than invariance, but it suffices to construct a unitary translation operator similar to the Koopman operator in the example above. G respects the measure class of μ means that the Radon-Nikodym derivative

$$s(g,x) = \bigg[\frac{d \mu}{d g^{-1}\mu}\bigg](x) \in [0, \infty)$$

is well-defined for every g ∈ G, where

$$g^{-1}\mu(A) = \mu(g A). \quad$$

It can be shown that there is a version of s which is jointly Borel measurable, that is

$$s : G \times X \rightarrow [0, \infty)$$

is Borel measurable and satisfies

$$s(g,x) = \bigg[\frac{d \mu}{d g^{-1}\mu}\bigg](x) \in [0, \infty)$$

for almost all values of (g, x) ∈ G × X.

Suppose H is a separable Hilbert space, U(H) the unitary operators on H. A unitary cocycle is a Borel mapping

$$\Phi: G \times X \rightarrow \operatorname{U}(H)$$

such that

$$\Phi(e, x) = I \quad$$

for almost all x ∈ X

$$\Phi(g h, x) = \Phi(g, h \cdot x) \Phi(h, x)$$

for almost all (g, h, x). A unitary cocycle is strict if and only if the above relations hold for all (g, h, x). It can be shown that for any unitary cocycle there is a strict unitary cocycle which is equal almost everywhere to it (Varadarajan, 1985).

Theorem. Define

$$[U_g \psi](x) = \sqrt{s(g,g^{-1}x)}\ \Phi(g, g^{-1} x) \ \psi(g^{-1} x).$$

Then U is a unitary representation of G on the Hilbert space

$$\int_X^\oplus H d \mu(x).$$

Moreover, if for any Borel set A, π(A) is the projection operator

$$\pi(A) \psi = 1_A \psi, \quad \int_X^\oplus H d \mu(x) \rightarrow \int_X^\oplus H d \mu(x),$$

then (U, π) is a system of imprimitivity of (G,X).

Conversely, any homogeneous system of imprimitivity is of this form, for some measure σ-finite measure μ. This measure is unique up to measure equivalence, that is to say, two such measures have the same sets of measure 0.

Much more can be said about the correspondence between homogeneous systems of imprimitivity and cocycles.

When the action of G on X is transitive however, the correspondence takes a particularly explicit form based on the representation obtained by restricting the cocycle Φ to a fixed point subgroup of the action. We consider this case in the next section.

=== Example ===
A system of imprimitivity (U, π) of (G,X) on a separable Hilbert space H is irreducible if and only if the only closed subspaces invariant under all the operators U_{g} and π(A) for g an element of G and A a Borel subset of X are H or {0}.

If (U, π) is irreducible, then π is homogeneous. Moreover, the corresponding measure on X as per the previous theorem is ergodic.

== Induced representations ==
If X is a Borel G space and x ∈ X, then the fixed point subgroup

$$G_x = \{g \in G: g \cdot x = x \}$$

is a closed subgroup of G. Since we are only assuming the action of G on X is Borel, this fact is non-trivial. To prove it, one can use the fact that a standard Borel G-space can be imbedded into a compact G-space in which the action is continuous.

Theorem. Suppose G acts on X transitively. Then there is a σ-finite quasi-invariant measure μ on X which is unique up to measure equivalence (that is any two such measures have the same sets of measure zero).

If Φ is a strict unitary cocycle

$$\Phi: G \times X \rightarrow \operatorname{U}(H)$$

then the restriction of Φ to the fixed point subgroup G_{x} is a Borel measurable unitary representation U of G_{x} on H (Here U(H) has the strong operator topology). However, it is known that a Borel measurable unitary representation is equal almost everywhere (with respect to Haar measure) to a strongly continuous unitary representation. This restriction mapping sets up a fundamental correspondence:

Theorem. Suppose G acts on X transitively with quasi-invariant measure μ. There is a bijection from unitary equivalence classes of systems of imprimitivity of (G, X) and unitary equivalence classes of representation of G_{x}.

Moreover, this bijection preserves irreducibility, that is a system of imprimitivity of (G, X) is irreducible if and only if the corresponding representation of G_{x} is irreducible.

Given a representation V of G_{x} the corresponding representation of G is called the representation induced by V.

See theorem 6.2 of (Varadarajan, 1985).

== Applications to the theory of group representations ==
Systems of imprimitivity arise naturally in the determination of the representations of a group G which is the semi-direct product of an abelian group N by a group H that acts by automorphisms of N. This means N is a normal subgroup of G and H a subgroup of G such that G = N H and N ∩ H = {e} (with e being the identity element of G).

An important example of this is the inhomogeneous Lorentz group.

Fix G, H and N as above and let X be the character space of N. In particular, H acts on X by

$$[ h \cdot \chi](n) = \chi(h^{-1} n h).$$

Theorem. There is a bijection between unitary equivalence classes of representations of G and unitary equivalence classes of systems of imprimitivity based on (H, X). This correspondence preserves intertwining operators. In particular, a representation of G is irreducible if and only if the corresponding system of imprimitivity is irreducible.

This result is of particular interest when the action of H on X is such that every ergodic quasi-invariant measure on X is transitive. In that case, each such measure is the image of (a totally finite version) of the Haar measure on X by the map

$$g \mapsto g \cdot x_0.$$

A necessary condition for this to be the case is that there is a countable set of H invariant Borel sets which separate the orbits of H. This is the case for instance for the action of the Lorentz group on the character space of R^{4}.

=== Example: the Heisenberg group ===
The Heisenberg group is the group of 3 × 3 real matrices of the form:

$$\begin{bmatrix} 1 & x & z \\0 & 1 & y \\ 0 & 0 & 1 \end{bmatrix}.$$

This group is the semi-direct product of

$$H = \bigg\{\begin{bmatrix} 1 & w & 0 \\0 & 1 & 0 \\ 0 & 0 & 1\end{bmatrix}: w \in \mathbb{R} \bigg\}$$

and the abelian normal subgroup

$$N = \bigg\{\begin{bmatrix} 1 & 0 & t \\0 & 1 & s \\ 0 & 0 & 1\end{bmatrix}: s,t \in \mathbb{R} \bigg\}.$$

Denote the typical matrix in H by [w] and the typical one in N by [s,t]. Then

$$[w]^{-1} \begin{bmatrix}s \\ t \end{bmatrix} [w] = \begin{bmatrix}s \\ - w s + t \end{bmatrix} = \begin{bmatrix} 1 & 0 \\ -w & 1 \end{bmatrix} \begin{bmatrix} s \\ t \end{bmatrix}.$$

w acts on the dual of R^{2} by multiplication by the transpose matrix

$$\begin{bmatrix} 1 & -w \\ 0 & 1 \end{bmatrix}.$$

This allows us to completely determine the orbits and the representation theory.

Orbit structure: The orbits fall into two classes:

- A horizontal line which intersects the y-axis at a non-zero value y_{0}. In this case, we can take the quasi-invariant measure on this line to be Lebesgue measure.
- A single point (x_{0},0) on the x-axis

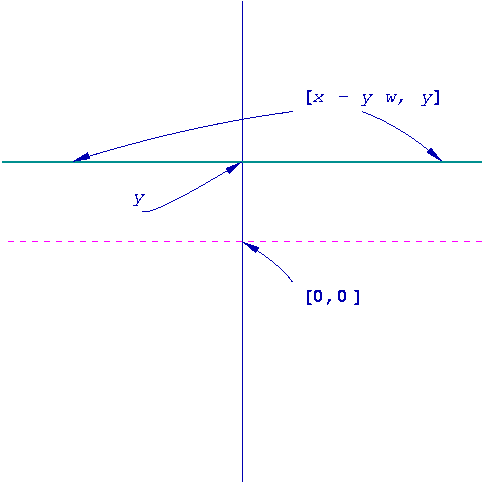
Orbit structure on dual space

Fixed point subgroups: These also fall into two classes depending on the orbit:

- The trivial subgroup {0}
- The group H itself

Classification: This allows us to completely classify all irreducible representations of the Heisenberg group. These are parametrized by the set consisting of

- R − {0}. These are infinite-dimensional.
- Pairs (x_{0}, λ) ∈ R × R. x_{0} is the abscissa of the single point orbit on the x-axis and λ is an element of the dual of H. These are one-dimensional.

We can write down explicit formulas for these representations by describing the restrictions to N and H.

Case 1. The corresponding representation π is of the form: It acts on L^{2}(R) with respect to Lebesgue measure and

$$(\pi [s,t] \psi)(x) = e^{i t y_0} e^{i s x} \psi (x). \quad$$
$$(\pi[w] \psi)(x) = \psi(x+w y_0).\quad$$

Case 2. The corresponding representation is given by the 1-dimensional character

$$\pi [s,t] = e^{i s x_0}. \quad$$

$$\pi[w] = e^{i \lambda w}. \quad$$
