= Shen Liming =

Chinese politician

Shen Liming (申黎明; born April 1964) is a politician in China.

== Life ==
Shen Liming was born in April 1964 in Huixian County, Henan Province. He obtained a master's degree from the Party School of the Henan Provincial Committee of the Chinese Communist Party with a bachelor's degree in on-the-job management.

In July 1985, he served as a clerk and section member of the Personnel Department of Henan Provincial Department of Justice; In March 1990, he became the Chinese Communist Party Committee Secretary of the Henan Provincial Department of Justice. In December 1995, he became deputy director of the Political Department of Henan Provincial Department of Justice. In April 1998, he was appointed Director of the Political Department of Henan Provincial Department of Justice. In January 2001, he was appointed deputy director of the Department of Justice of Henan Province and member of the Party Committee. Since July 2002, he has been member of the Standing Committee of the Sanmenxia Municipal Committee of the Chinese Communist Party (CCP) and Secretary of the Political and Legal Committee. Member of the Standing Committee of the CCP Henan Provincial Commission for Discipline Inspection and Deputy Secretary of the Provincial Political and Legal Committee.

In July 2017, he was appointed CCP Committee Secretary and Director of the Department of Justice of Henan Province.

In September 2021, he was appointed deputy Secretary-General of the Standing Committee of the Henan Provincial People's Congress.
