= Theta representation =

In mathematics, the theta representation is a particular representation of the Heisenberg group of quantum mechanics. It gains its name from the fact that the Jacobi theta function is invariant under the action of a discrete subgroup of the Heisenberg group. The representation was popularized by David Mumford.

== Construction ==
The theta representation is a representation of the continuous Heisenberg group $H_3(\R)$ over the field of the real numbers. In this representation, the group elements act on a particular Hilbert space. The construction below proceeds first by defining operators that correspond to the Heisenberg group generators. Next, the Hilbert space on which these act is defined, followed by a demonstration of the isomorphism to the usual representations.

=== Operators and group law ===
Let f(z) be a holomorphic function, let a and b be real numbers, and let $\tau$ be an arbitrary fixed complex number in the upper half-plane; that is, so that the imaginary part of $\tau$ is positive. Define the operators S_{a} and T_{b} such that they act on holomorphic functions as

$$(S_a f)(z) = f(z+a)= \exp(a\partial_z)f(z)$$

and

$$(T_b f)(z) = \exp(i\pi b^2 \tau +2\pi ibz) f(z+b\tau)
= \exp(i\pi b^2 \tau + 2\pi i bz + b\tau\partial_z) f(z).$$

It can be seen that each operator generates a one-parameter subgroup:

$$S_{a_1}\left(S_{a_2}f\right)=S_{a_1+a_2}f$$

and

$$T_{b_1}\left(T_{b_2}f\right)=T_{b_1+b_2}f.$$

However, S and T do not commute:

$$S_aT_b=\exp(2\pi iab)T_bS_a.$$

Thus $S$ and $T$ together with a unitary phase form a nilpotent Lie group, the continuous real Heisenberg group, parametrizable as $H=U(1)\times\R\times\R$, where $U(1)$ is the unitary group.

A general group element $U_\tau(\lambda,a,b)\in H$ then acts on a holomorphic function f(z) as

$$U_\tau(\lambda,a,b) f(z)
=
\lambda(S_aT_bf)(z)
=
\lambda\exp(i\pi b^2\tau+2\pi ibz)f(z+a+b\tau),$$

where $\lambda\in U(1)$. The subgroup $U(1)$ is the center $Z(H)$ of $H$, and is also its commutator subgroup $[H,H]$. The parameter $\tau$ on $U_\tau(\lambda,a,b)$ serves only to remind that every different value of $\tau$ gives rise to a different representation of the action of the group.

=== Hilbert space ===
The action of the group elements $U_\tau(\lambda,a,b)$ is unitary and irreducible on a certain Hilbert space of functions. For a fixed value of $\tau$, define a norm on entire functions of the complex plane as

$$\Vert f \Vert_\tau ^2
=
\int_{\C}
\exp\left(\frac{-2\pi y^2}{\Im\tau}\right)
|f(x+iy)|^2\,dx\,dy.$$

Here, $\Im\tau$ is the imaginary part of $\tau$ and the domain of integration is the entire complex plane. Let $\mathcal H_\tau$ be the set of entire functions f with finite norm. The subscript $\tau$ is used only to indicate that the space depends on the choice of parameter $\tau$. This $\mathcal H_\tau$ forms a Hilbert space. The action of $U_\tau(\lambda,a,b)$ given above is unitary on $\mathcal H_\tau$, that is, $U_\tau(\lambda,a,b)$ preserves the norm on this space. Finally, the action of $U_\tau(\lambda,a,b)$ on $\mathcal H_\tau$ is irreducible.

This norm is closely related to that used to define the Segal–Bargmann space.

=== Relation with the Weyl representation ===
The above theta representation of the Heisenberg group is isomorphic to the canonical Weyl representation of the Heisenberg group. In particular, this implies that $\mathcal H_\tau$ and $L^2(\R)$ are isomorphic as $H$-modules. Let

$$M(a,b,c)=
\begin{bmatrix}
1 & a & c\\
0 & 1 & b\\
0 & 0 & 1
\end{bmatrix}$$

stand for a general group element of $H_3(\R)$. In the canonical Weyl representation, for every real number h, there is a representation $\rho_h$ acting on $L^2(\R)$ as

$$\rho_h(M(a,b,c))\psi(x)=\exp(ibx+ihc)\psi(x+ha)$$

for $x\in\R$ and $\psi\in L^2(\R)$.

Here, h is the Planck constant. Each such representation is unitarily inequivalent. The corresponding theta representation is:

$$M(a,0,0)\mapsto S_{ah},$$
$$M(0,b,0)\mapsto T_{b/2\pi},$$
$$M(0,0,c)\mapsto e^{ihc}.$$

== Theta functions ==
The Heisenberg group can be used to give a unified account of theta functions in complex analysis and algebraic geometry. For $\tau$ in the upper half-plane, the standard Jacobi theta function is

$$\vartheta(z,\tau)=
\sum_{n\in\mathbb Z}
\exp(\pi i n^2\tau+2\pi inz).$$

It is an entire function of $z$ satisfying the transformation laws

$$\vartheta(z+1,\tau)=\vartheta(z,\tau),
\qquad
\vartheta(z+\tau,\tau)
=
e^{-\pi i\tau-2\pi iz}\vartheta(z,\tau).$$

More generally, for integers $a$ and $b$,

$$\vartheta(z+a+b\tau,\tau)
=
\exp(-\pi ib^2\tau-2\pi ibz)\vartheta(z,\tau).$$

Define the subgroup $\Gamma_\tau\subset H$ as

$$\Gamma_\tau=\{U_\tau(1,a,b)\in H:a,b\in\mathbb Z\}.$$

The preceding transformation laws say exactly that $\vartheta(z,\tau)$ is invariant under $\Gamma_\tau$. It can be shown that the Jacobi theta function is the unique such entire function, up to scalar multiple.

Thus $\vartheta(z,\tau)$ is not an ordinary function on the elliptic curve

$$E_\tau=\mathbb C/(\mathbb Z+\tau\mathbb Z),$$

but rather a section of a line bundle on $E_\tau$. In one common convention, this line bundle is obtained from $\mathbb C\times\mathbb C$ by the identifications

$$(z,w)\sim(z+1,w),
\qquad
(z,w)\sim(z+\tau,e^{-\pi i\tau-2\pi iz}w).$$

The exponential factors in the theta transformation laws are the corresponding factors of automorphy. In this sense, a theta function is a function on the universal cover whose transformation law allows it to descend as a section of a line bundle on the quotient torus.

The Heisenberg group appears because translations of $z$ must be accompanied by scalar factors in order to preserve these transformation laws. Thus translations in the two period directions define a projective representation, and the corresponding central extension is a Heisenberg group.

=== Theta functions with characteristics ===
Theta functions with rational characteristics are obtained by applying Heisenberg operators to $\vartheta$. For $a,b\in\mathbb Q$, define

$$\vartheta_{a,b}(z,\tau)
=
(S_bT_a\vartheta)(z,\tau)
=
e^{\pi ia^2\tau+2\pi ia(z+b)}
\vartheta(z+a\tau+b,\tau).$$

Equivalently,

$$\vartheta_{a,b}(z,\tau)
=
\sum_{n\in\mathbb Z}
\exp\!\left(\pi i(n+a)^2\tau
+2\pi i(n+a)(z+b)\right).$$

Changing $a$ and $b$ by integers changes these functions only by simple scalar factors, so the characteristics are naturally considered modulo $\mathbb Z$.

This gives a concrete finite-dimensional form of the Heisenberg representation. If $L$ is the degree-one theta line bundle on $E_\tau$, then

$$\dim H^0(E_\tau,L^{\otimes N})=N.$$

A basis of this space may be chosen from theta functions with characteristics. The action of translations by $N$-torsion points, together with the necessary scalar factors, gives a finite Heisenberg group acting on $H^0(E_\tau,L^{\otimes N})$. This is the finite-dimensional analogue of the Schrödinger representation.

== Theta groups ==
More generally, one can associate to a line bundle $L$ on an abelian variety $A$ its theta group $G(L)$. Let

$$K(L)=\{x\in A\mid t_x^*L\simeq L\},$$

where $t_x:A\to A$ denotes translation by $x$. The theta group consists of pairs $(x,\phi)$, where $x\in K(L)$ and $\phi:L\to t_x^*L$ is an isomorphism of line bundles. It fits into a central extension

$$1\longrightarrow \mathbb G_m
\longrightarrow G(L)
\longrightarrow K(L)
\longrightarrow 1.$$

When $L$ is ample, $K(L)$ is finite, and $G(L)$ is a finite algebraic analogue of the Heisenberg group.

The group $G(L)$ acts naturally on the vector space of sections $H^0(A,L)$. This action is the algebro-geometric analogue of the Schrödinger representation of the real Heisenberg group. When $L$ is ample, the commutator in $G(L)$ induces a nondegenerate alternating pairing on $K(L)$, analogous to the symplectic form used in the construction of the ordinary Heisenberg group. A finite version of the Stone–von Neumann theorem describes the resulting irreducible representation with prescribed central character.

David Mumford used this Heisenberg-group formalism to give an algebraic theory of theta functions and to study equations defining abelian varieties.

== See also ==
- Segal–Bargmann space
- Hardy space
