= Panagiota Daskalopoulos =

Greek mathematician

Panagiota Daskalopoulos is a professor of mathematics at Columbia University whose research involves partial differential equations and differential geometry. At Columbia, she also serves as director of undergraduate studies for mathematics.

Daskalopoulos earned a degree from the University of Athens in 1986, and completed her PhD from the University of Chicago in 1992, under the supervision of Carlos Kenig. After a visiting position at the Institute for Advanced Study, she joined the faculty of the University of Minnesota in 1993, moved to the University of California, Irvine in 1995, and moved again to Columbia in 2001. She was a Guggenheim Fellow in 2004, and an invited speaker at the International Congress of Mathematicians in 2014. She is a member of the Scientific Advisory Committee of the Mathematical Sciences Research Institute in Berkeley, California for the term 2013–2017. She was named a fellow of the American Academy of Arts and Sciences in 2022. She was awarded the 2023 AMS Ruth Lyttle Satter Prize.
