= Zhongwei Shen =

Chinese-American mathematician

Zhongwei Shen (Chinese: 申仲伟; born c. 1964) is a Chinese-American mathematician, currently a distinguished professor at University of Kentucky and a Fellow of the American Mathematical Society.

Shen received his B.S. in mathematics from Peking University in 1982 at the age of 18. He has been a visiting scholar at Lanzhou University's School of Mathematics and Statistics on various occasions since 2007. He was named a Changjiang Scholar of Lanzhou University in 2015.
