= Timeline of abelian varieties =

This is a timeline of the theory of abelian varieties in algebraic geometry, including elliptic curves.

== Early history ==
- 3rd century AD Diophantus of Alexandria studies rational points on elliptic curves
- c. 1000 Al-Karaji writes on congruent numbers

== Seventeenth century ==
- Fermat studies descent for elliptic curves
- 1643 Fermat poses an elliptic curve Diophantine equation
- 1670 Fermat's son published his Diophantus with notes

== Eighteenth century ==
- 1718 Giulio Carlo Fagnano dei Toschi, studies the rectification of the lemniscate, addition results for elliptic integrals.
- 1736 Leonhard Euler writes on the pendulum equation without the small-angle approximation.
- 1738 Euler writes on curves of genus 1 considered by Fermat and Frenicle
- 1750 Euler writes on elliptic integrals
- 23 December 1751 – 27 January 1752: Birth of the theory of elliptic functions, according to later remarks of Jacobi, as Euler writes on Fagnano's work.
- 1775 John Landen publishes Landen's transformation, an isogeny formula.
- 1786 Adrien-Marie Legendre begins to write on elliptic integrals
- 1797 Carl Friedrich Gauss discovers double periodicity of the lemniscate function
- 1799 Gauss finds the connection of the length of a lemniscate and a case of the arithmetic-geometric mean, giving a numerical method for a complete elliptic integral.

== Nineteenth century ==
- 1826 Niels Henrik Abel, Abel-Jacobi map
- 1827 Inversion of elliptic integrals independently by Abel and Carl Gustav Jacob Jacobi
- 1829 Jacobi, Fundamenta nova theoriae functionum ellipticarum, introduces four theta functions of one variable
- 1835 Jacobi points out the use of the group law for diophantine geometry, in De usu Theoriae Integralium Ellipticorum et Integralium Abelianorum in Analysi Diophantea
- 1836-7 Friedrich Julius Richelot, the Richelot isogeny.
- 1847 Adolph Göpel gives the equation of the Kummer surface
- 1851 Johann Georg Rosenhain writes a prize essay on the inversion problem in genus 2.
- c. 1850 Thomas Weddle - Weddle surface
- 1856 Weierstrass elliptic functions
- 1857 Bernhard Riemann lays the foundations for further work on abelian varieties in dimension > 1, introducing the Riemann bilinear relations and Riemann theta function.
- 1865 Carl Johannes Thomae, Theorie der ultraelliptischen Funktionen und Integrale erster und zweiter Ordnung
- 1866 Alfred Clebsch and Paul Gordan, Theorie der Abel'schen Functionen
- 1869 Karl Weierstrass proves an abelian function satisfies an algebraic addition theorem
- 1879, Charles Auguste Briot, Théorie des fonctions abéliennes
- 1880 In a letter to Richard Dedekind, Leopold Kronecker describes his Jugendtraum, to use complex multiplication theory to generate abelian extensions of imaginary quadratic fields
- 1884 Sofia Kovalevskaya writes on the reduction of abelian functions to elliptic functions
- 1888 Friedrich Schottky finds a non-trivial condition on the theta constants for curves of genus $g = 4$, launching the Schottky problem.
- 1891 Appell–Humbert theorem of Paul Émile Appell and Georges Humbert, classifies the holomorphic line bundles on an abelian surface by cocycle data.
- 1894 Die Entwicklung der Theorie der algebräischen Functionen in älterer und neuerer Zeit, report by Alexander von Brill and Max Noether
- 1895 Wilhelm Wirtinger, Untersuchungen über Thetafunktionen, studies Prym varieties
- 1897 H. F. Baker, Abelian Functions: Abel's Theorem and the Allied Theory of Theta Functions

== Twentieth century ==
- c.1910 The theory of Poincaré normal functions implies that the Picard variety and Albanese variety are isogenous.
- 1913 Torelli's theorem
- 1916 Gaetano Scorza applies the term "abelian variety" to complex tori.
- 1921 Solomon Lefschetz shows that any complex torus with Riemann matrix satisfying the necessary conditions can be embedded in some complex projective space using theta-functions
- 1922 Louis Mordell proves Mordell's theorem: the rational points on an elliptic curve over the rational numbers form a finitely-generated abelian group
- 1929 Arthur B. Coble, Algebraic Geometry and Theta Functions
- 1939 Siegel modular forms
- c. 1940 André Weil defines "abelian variety"
- 1952 Weil defines an intermediate Jacobian
- Theorem of the cube
- Selmer group
- Michael Atiyah classifies holomorphic vector bundles on an elliptic curve
- 1961 Goro Shimura and Yutaka Taniyama, Complex Multiplication of Abelian Varieties and its Applications to Number Theory
- Néron model
- Birch–Swinnerton–Dyer conjecture
- Moduli space for abelian varieties
- Duality of abelian varieties
- c.1967 David Mumford develops a new theory of the equations defining abelian varieties
- 1968 Serre–Tate theorem on good reduction extends the results of Max Deuring on elliptic curves to the abelian variety case.
- c. 1980 Mukai–Fourier transform: the Poincaré line bundle as Mukai–Fourier kernel induces an equivalence of the derived categories of coherent sheaves for an abelian variety and its dual.
- 1983 Takahiro Shiota proves Novikov's conjecture on the Schottky problem
- 1985 Jean-Marc Fontaine shows that any positive-dimensional abelian variety over the rationals has bad reduction somewhere.

== Twenty-first century ==
- 2001 Proof of the modularity theorem for elliptic curves is completed.
