= Theta characteristic =

In mathematics, a theta characteristic of a non-singular algebraic curve C is a divisor class Θ such that 2Θ is the canonical class. In terms of holomorphic line bundles L on a connected compact Riemann surface, it is therefore L such that L^{2} is the canonical bundle, here also equivalently the holomorphic cotangent bundle. In terms of algebraic geometry, the equivalent definition is as an invertible sheaf, which squares to the sheaf of differentials of the first kind. Theta characteristics were introduced by Rosenhain (1851)

== History and genus 1 ==
The importance of this concept was realised first in the analytic theory of theta functions, and geometrically in the theory of bitangents. In the analytic theory, there are four fundamental theta functions in the theory of Jacobian elliptic functions. Their labels are in effect the theta characteristics of an elliptic curve. For that case, the canonical class is trivial (zero in the divisor class group) and so the theta characteristics of an elliptic curve E over the complex numbers are seen to be in 1-1 correspondence with the four points P on E with 2P = 0; this is counting of the solutions is clear from the group structure, a product of two circle groups, when E is treated as a complex torus.

== Higher genus ==
For C of genus 0 there is one such divisor class, namely the class of -P, where P is any point on the curve. In case of higher genus g, assuming the field over which C is defined does not have characteristic 2, the theta characteristics can be counted as

2^{2g}

in number if the base field is algebraically closed.

This comes about because the solutions of the equation on the divisor class level will form a single coset of the solutions of

2D = 0.

In other words, with K the canonical class and Θ any given solution of

2Θ = K,

any other solution will be of form

Θ + D.

This reduces counting the theta characteristics to finding the 2-rank of the Jacobian variety J(C) of C. In the complex case, again, the result follows since J(C) is a complex torus of dimension 2g. Over a general field, see the theory explained at Hasse-Witt matrix for the counting of the p-rank of an abelian variety. The answer is the same, provided the characteristic of the field is not 2.

A theta characteristic Θ will be called even or odd depending on the dimension of its space of global sections $H^0(C, \Theta)$. It turns out that on C there are $2^{g - 1} (2^g + 1)$ even and $2^{g-1}(2^g - 1)$ odd theta characteristics.

== Classical theory ==
Classically the theta characteristics were divided into these two kinds, odd and even, according to the value of the Arf invariant of a certain quadratic form Q with values mod 2. Thus in case of g = 3 and a plane quartic curve, there were 28 of one type, and the remaining 36 of the other; this is basic in the question of counting bitangents, as it corresponds to the 28 bitangents of a quartic. The geometric construction of Q as an intersection form is with modern tools possible algebraically. In fact the Weil pairing applies, in its abelian variety form. Triples (θ_{1}, θ_{2}, θ_{3}) of theta characteristics are called syzygetic and asyzygetic depending on whether Arf(θ_{1})+Arf(θ_{2})+Arf(θ_{3})+Arf(θ_{1}+θ_{2}+θ_{3}) is 0 or 1.

== Spin structures ==
Atiyah (1971) showed that, for a compact complex manifold, choices of theta characteristics correspond bijectively to spin structures.
