= Schottky problem =

Mathematical question in algebraic geometry

In mathematics, the Schottky problem, named after Friedrich Schottky, is a classical question of algebraic geometry, asking for a characterisation of Jacobian varieties amongst abelian varieties.

== Geometric formulation ==
More precisely, one should consider algebraic curves $C$ of a given genus $g$, and their Jacobians $\operatorname{Jac}(C)$. There is a moduli space $\mathcal{M}_g$ of such curves, and a moduli space of abelian varieties, $\mathcal{A}_g$, of dimension $g$, which are principally polarized. There is a morphism

$\operatorname{Jac}: \mathcal{M}_g \to \mathcal{A}_g$

which on points (geometric points, to be more accurate) takes isomorphism class $[C]$ to $[\operatorname{Jac}(C)]$. The content of Torelli's theorem is that $\operatorname{Jac}$ is injective (again, on points). The Schottky problem asks for a description of the image of $\operatorname{Jac}$, denoted $\mathcal{J}_g = \operatorname{Jac}(\mathcal{M}_g)$.

The dimension of $\mathcal{M}_g$ is $3g - 3$, for $g \geq 2$, while the dimension of $\mathcal{A}_g$ is g(g + 1)/2. This means that the dimensions are the same (0, 1, 3, 6) for g = 0, 1, 2, 3. Therefore $g = 4$ is the first case where the dimensions change, and this was studied by F. Schottky in the 1880s. Schottky applied the theta constants, which are modular forms for the Siegel upper half-space, to define the Schottky locus in $\mathcal{A}_g$. A more precise form of the question is to determine whether the image of $\operatorname{Jac}$ essentially coincides with the Schottky locus (in other words, whether it is Zariski dense there).

=== Dimension 1 case ===
All elliptic curves are the Jacobian of themselves, hence the moduli stack of elliptic curves $\mathcal{M}_{1,1}$ is a model for $\mathcal{A}_1$.

=== Dimensions 2 and 3 ===
In the case of Abelian surfaces, there are two types of Abelian varieties: the Jacobian of a genus 2 curve, or the product of Jacobians of elliptic curves. This means the moduli spaces

$\mathcal{M}_2, \mathcal{M}_{1,1}\times \mathcal{M}_{1,1}$

embed into $\mathcal{A}_2$. There is a similar description for dimension 3 since an Abelian variety can be the product of Jacobians.

== Period lattice formulation ==
If one describes the moduli space $\mathcal{A}_g$ in intuitive terms, as the parameters on which an abelian variety depends, then the Schottky problem asks simply what condition on the parameters implies that the abelian variety comes from a curve's Jacobian. The classical case, over the complex number field, has received most of the attention, and then an abelian variety A is simply a complex torus of a particular type, arising from a lattice in C^{g}. In relatively concrete terms, it is being asked which lattices are the period lattices of compact Riemann surfaces.

== Riemann's matrix formulation ==
Note that a Riemann matrix is quite different from any Riemann tensor

One of the major achievements of Bernhard Riemann was his theory of complex tori and theta functions. Using the Riemann theta function, necessary and sufficient conditions on a lattice were written down by Riemann for a lattice in C^{g} to have the corresponding torus embed into complex projective space. (The interpretation may have come later, with Solomon Lefschetz, but Riemann's theory was definitive.) The data is what is now called a Riemann matrix. Therefore, the complex Schottky problem becomes the question of characterising the period matrices of compact Riemann surfaces of genus g, formed by integrating a basis for the abelian integrals round a basis for the first homology group, amongst all Riemann matrices. It was solved by Takahiro Shiota in 1986.

== Geometry of the problem ==
There are a number of geometric approaches, and the question has also been shown to implicate the Kadomtsev–Petviashvili equation, related to soliton theory.

== See also ==
- Moduli of abelian varieties
