= Dual abelian variety =

In mathematics, a dual abelian variety can be defined from an abelian variety A, defined over a field k. A 1-dimensional abelian variety is an elliptic curve, and every elliptic curve is isomorphic to its dual, but this fails for higher-dimensional abelian varieties, so the concept of dual becomes more interesting in higher dimensions.

== Definition ==
Let A be an abelian variety over a field k. We define $\operatorname{Pic}^0 (A) \subset \operatorname{Pic} (A)$ to be the subgroup of the Picard group consisting of line bundles L such that $m^*L \cong p^*L \otimes q^*L$, where $m, p, q$ are the multiplication and projection maps $A \times_k A \to A$ respectively. An element of $\operatorname{Pic}^0(A)$ is called a degree 0 line bundle on A.

To A one then associates a dual abelian variety A^{v} (over the same field), which is the solution to the following moduli problem. A family of degree 0 line bundles parametrized by a k-variety T is defined to be a line bundle L on A×T such that

1. for all $t \in T$, the restriction of L to A×{t} is a degree 0 line bundle,
2. the restriction of L to {0}×T is a trivial line bundle (here 0 is the identity of A).

Then there is a variety A^{v} and a line bundle $P \to A \times A^\vee$, called the Poincaré bundle, which is a family of degree 0 line bundles parametrized by A^{v} in the sense of the above definition. Moreover, this family is universal, that is, to any family L parametrized by T is associated a unique morphism f: T → A^{v} so that L is isomorphic to the pullback of P along the morphism 1_{A}×f: A×T → A×A^{v}. Applying this to the case when T is a point, we see that the points of A^{v} correspond to line bundles of degree 0 on A, so there is a natural group operation on A^{v} given by tensor product of line bundles, which makes it into an abelian variety.

In the language of representable functors one can state the above result as follows. The contravariant functor, which associates to each k-variety T the set of families of degree 0 line bundles parametrised by T and to each k-morphism f: T → T' the mapping induced by the pullback with f, is representable. The universal element representing this functor is the pair (A^{v}, P).

This association is a duality in the sense that there is a natural isomorphism between the double dual A^{vv} and A (defined via the Poincaré bundle) and that it is contravariant functorial, i.e. it associates to all morphisms f: A → B dual morphisms f^{v}: B^{v} → A^{v} in a compatible way. The n-torsion of an abelian variety and the n-torsion of its dual are dual to each other when n is coprime to the characteristic of the base. In general - for all n - the n-torsion group schemes of dual abelian varieties are Cartier duals of each other. This generalizes the Weil pairing for elliptic curves.

== History ==
The theory was first put into a good form when K was the field of complex numbers. In that case there is a general form of duality between the Albanese variety of a complete variety V, and its Picard variety; this was realised, for definitions in terms of complex tori, as soon as André Weil had given a general definition of Albanese variety. For an abelian variety A, the Albanese variety is A itself, so the dual should be Pic^{0}(A), the connected component of the identity element of what in contemporary terminology is the Picard scheme.

For the case of the Jacobian variety J of a compact Riemann surface C, the choice of a principal polarization of J gives rise to an identification of J with its own Picard variety. This in a sense is just a consequence of Abel's theorem. For general abelian varieties, still over the complex numbers, A is in the same isogeny class as its dual. An explicit isogeny can be constructed by use of an invertible sheaf L on A (i.e. in this case a holomorphic line bundle), when the subgroup

K(L)

of translations on L that take L into an isomorphic copy is itself finite. In that case, the quotient

A/K(L)

is isomorphic to the dual abelian variety A^{v}.

This construction of A^{v} extends to any field K of characteristic zero. In terms of this definition, the Poincaré bundle, a universal line bundle can be defined on

A × A^{v}.

The construction when K has characteristic p uses scheme theory. The definition of K(L) has to be in terms of a group scheme that is a scheme-theoretic stabilizer, and the quotient taken is now a quotient by a subgroup scheme.

== The Dual Isogeny ==
Let $f: A \to B$ be an isogeny of abelian varieties. (That is, $f$ is finite-to-one and surjective.) We will construct an isogeny $f^\vee: B^\vee \to A^\vee$ using the functorial description of $A^\vee$, which says that the data of a map $f^\vee: B^\vee \to A^\vee$ is the same as giving a family of degree zero line bundles on $A$, parametrized by $B^\vee$.

To this end, consider the isogeny $f \times 1_{B^\vee}: A \times B^\vee \to B \times B^\vee$ and $(f \times 1_{B^\vee})^* P_{B}$ where $P_B$ is the Poincare line bundle for $B$. This is then the required family of degree zero line bundles on $A$.

By the aforementioned functorial description, there is then a morphism $f^\vee: B^\vee \to A^\vee$ so that $(f^\vee \times 1_A)^*P_A \cong (f \times 1_{B^\vee})^* P_{B}$. One can show using this description that this map is an isogeny of the same degree as $f$, and that $f^{\vee\vee} = f$.

Hence, we obtain a contravariant endofunctor on the category of abelian varieties which squares to the identity. This kind of functor is often called a dualizing functor.

== Mukai's Theorem ==
A celebrated theorem of Mukai states that there is an isomorphism of derived categories $D^b(A) \cong D^b(A^\vee)$, where $D^b(X)$ denotes the bounded derived category of coherent sheaves on X. Historically, this was the first use of the Fourier-Mukai transform and shows that the bounded derived category cannot necessarily distinguish non-isomorphic varieties.

Recall that if X and Y are varieties, and $\mathcal{K} \in D^b(X \times Y)$ is a complex of coherent sheaves, we define the Fourier-Mukai transform $\Phi^{X \to Y}_{\mathcal{K}}: D^b(X) \to D^b(Y)$ to be the composition $\Phi^{X \to Y}_{\mathcal{K}}(\cdot) = Rq_*(\mathcal{K} \otimes_L Lp^*(\cdot))$, where p and q are the projections onto X and Y respectively.

Note that $p$ is flat and hence $p^*$ is exact on the level of coherent sheaves, and in applications $\mathcal{K}$ is often a line bundle so one may usually leave the left derived functors underived in the above expression. Note also that one can analogously define a Fourier-Mukai transform $\Phi_{\mathcal{K}}^{Y \to X}$ using the same kernel, by just interchanging the projection maps in the formula.

The statement of Mukai's theorem is then as follows.

Theorem: Let A be an abelian variety of dimension g and $P_A$ the Poincare line bundle on $A \times A^\vee$. Then, $\Phi_{P_A}^{A^\vee \to A} \circ \Phi_{P_A}^{A\to A^\vee} \cong \iota^*[-g]$, where $\iota: A \to A$ is the inversion map, and $[-g]$ is the shift functor. In particular, $\Phi_{P_A}^{A\to A^\vee}$ is an isomorphism.
