= Level structure (algebraic geometry) =

In algebraic geometry, a level structure on a space X is an extra structure attached to X that shrinks or eliminates the automorphism group of X, by demanding automorphisms to preserve the level structure; attaching a level structure is often phrased as rigidifying the geometry of X.

In applications, a level structure is used in the construction of moduli spaces; a moduli space is often constructed as a quotient. The presence of automorphisms poses a difficulty to forming a quotient; thus introducing level structures helps overcome this difficulty.

There is no single definition of a level structure; rather, depending on the space X, one introduces the notion of a level structure. The classic one is that on an elliptic curve (see #Example: an abelian scheme). There is a level structure attached to a formal group called a Drinfeld level structure, introduced in (Drinfeld 1974).

== Level structures on elliptic curves ==
Classically, level structures on elliptic curves $E = \mathbb{C}/\Lambda$ are given by a lattice containing the defining lattice of the variety. From the moduli theory of elliptic curves, all such lattices can be described as the lattice $\mathbb{Z}\oplus \mathbb{Z}\cdot \tau$ for $\tau \in \mathfrak{h}$ in the upper-half plane. Then, the lattice generated by $1/n, \tau/n$ gives a lattice which contains all $n$-torsion points on the elliptic curve denoted $E[n]$. In fact, given such a lattice is invariant under the $\Gamma(n) \subset \text{SL}_2(\mathbb{Z})$ action on $\mathfrak{h}$, where

$$\begin{align}
\Gamma(n) &= \text{ker}(\text{SL}_2(\mathbb{Z}) \to \text{SL}_2(\mathbb{Z}/n)) \\
&= \left\{
M \in \text{SL}_2(\mathbb{Z}) : M \equiv \begin{pmatrix}
1 & 0 \\
0 & 1
\end{pmatrix} \text{ (mod n)}
\right\}
\end{align}$$

hence it gives a point in $\Gamma(n)\backslash\mathfrak{h}$ called the moduli space of level N structures of elliptic curves $Y(n)$, which is a modular curve. In fact, this moduli space contains slightly more information: the Weil pairing

$e_n\left(\frac{1}{n}, \frac{\tau}{n}\right) = e^{2\pi i /n}$

gives a point in the $n$-th roots of unity, hence in $\mathbb{Z}/n$.

== Example: an abelian scheme ==
Let $X \to S$ be an abelian scheme whose geometric fibers have dimension g.

Let n be a positive integer that is prime to the residue field of each s in S. For n ≥ 2, a level n-structure is a set of sections $\sigma_1, \dots, \sigma_{2g}$ such that

1. for each geometric point $s : S \to X$, $\sigma_{i}(s)$ form a basis for the group of points of order n in $\overline{X}_s$,
2. $m_n \circ \sigma_i$ is the identity section, where $m_n$ is the multiplication by n.

See also: modular curve#Examples, moduli stack of elliptic curves.

== See also ==
- Siegel modular form
- Rigidity (mathematics)
- Local rigidity
