= Moduli stack of elliptic curves =

Algebraic stack in mathematics

In mathematics, the moduli stack of elliptic curves, denoted as $\mathcal{M}_{1,1}$ or $\mathcal{M}_{\mathrm{ell}}$, is an algebraic stack over $\text{Spec}(\mathbb{Z})$ classifying elliptic curves. Note that it is a special case of the moduli stack of algebraic curves $\mathcal{M}_{g,n}$. In particular its points with values in some field correspond to elliptic curves over the field, and more generally morphisms from a scheme $S$ to it correspond to elliptic curves over $S$. The construction of this space spans over a century because of the various generalizations of elliptic curves as the field has developed. All of these generalizations are contained in $\mathcal{M}_{1,1}$.

== Properties ==
=== Smooth Deligne-Mumford stack ===
The moduli stack of elliptic curves is a smooth separated Deligne–Mumford stack of finite type over $\text{Spec}(\mathbb{Z})$, but is not a scheme as elliptic curves have non-trivial automorphisms.

=== j-invariant ===
There is a proper morphism of $\mathcal{M}_{1,1}$ to the affine line, the coarse moduli space of elliptic curves, given by the j-invariant of an elliptic curve.

== Construction over the complex numbers ==
It is a classical observation that every elliptic curve over $\mathbb{C}$ is classified by its periods. Given a basis for its integral homology $\alpha,\beta \in H_1(E,\mathbb{Z})$ and a global holomorphic differential form $\omega \in \Gamma(E,\Omega^1_E)$ (which exists since it is smooth and the dimension of the space of such differentials is equal to the genus, 1), the integrals
$$\begin{bmatrix}\int_\alpha \omega & \int_\beta\omega \end{bmatrix} = \begin{bmatrix}\omega_1 & \omega_2 \end{bmatrix}$$
give the generators for a $\mathbb{Z}$-lattice of rank 2 inside of $\mathbb{C}$. Conversely, given an integral lattice $\Lambda$ of rank $2$ inside of $\mathbb{C}$, there is an embedding of the complex torus $E_\Lambda = \mathbb{C}/\Lambda$ into $\mathbb{P}^2$ from the Weierstrass P function. This isomorphic correspondence $\phi:\mathbb{C}/\Lambda \to E(\mathbb{C})$ is given by
$$z \mapsto [\wp(z,\Lambda),\wp'(z,\Lambda),1] \in \mathbb{P}^2(\mathbb{C})$$
and holds up to homothety of the lattice $\Lambda$, which is the equivalence relation
$$z\Lambda \sim \Lambda ~\text{for}~ z \in \mathbb{C} \setminus\{0\}$$
It is standard to then write the lattice in the form $\mathbb{Z}\oplus\mathbb{Z}\cdot \tau$ for $\tau \in \mathfrak{h}$, an element of the upper half-plane, since the lattice $\Lambda$ could be multiplied by $\omega_1^{-1}$, and $\tau,-\tau$ both generate the same sublattice. Then, the upper half-plane gives a parameter space of all elliptic curves over $\mathbb{C}$. There is an additional equivalence of curves given by the action of the
$$\text{SL}_2(\mathbb{Z})= \left\{
\begin{pmatrix}
a & b \\
c & d
\end{pmatrix} \in \text{Mat}_{2,2}(\mathbb{Z}) : ad-bc = 1
\right\}$$
where an elliptic curve defined by the lattice $\mathbb{Z}\oplus\mathbb{Z}\cdot \tau$ is isomorphic to curves defined by the lattice $\mathbb{Z}\oplus\mathbb{Z}\cdot \tau'$ given by the modular action
$$\begin{align}
\begin{pmatrix}
a & b \\
c & d
\end{pmatrix} \cdot \tau &= \frac{a\tau + b}{c\tau + d} \\
&= \tau'
\end{align}$$
Then, the moduli stack of elliptic curves over $\mathbb{C}$ is given by the stack quotient
$$\mathcal{M}_{1,1} \cong[\text{SL}_2(\mathbb{Z})\backslash\mathfrak{h}]$$
Note some authors construct this moduli space by instead using the action of the Modular group $\text{PSL}_2(\mathbb{Z}) = \text{SL}_2(\mathbb{Z})/\{\pm I\}$. In this case, the points in $\mathcal{M}_{1,1}$ having only trivial stabilizers are dense.

Fundamental domains of the action of $\text{SL}_2(\mathbb{Z})$ on the upper half-plane are shown here as pairs of ideal triangles of different colors sharing an edge. The "standard" fundamental domain is shown with darker edges. Suitably identifying points on the boundary of this region, we obtain the coarse moduli space of elliptic curves. The stacky points at $\tau = i$ and $\tau = e^{2\pi i / 3}, e^{\pi i / 3}$ are on the boundary of this region.

$\qquad$

=== Stacky/Orbifold points ===
Generically, the points in $\mathcal{M}_{1,1}$ are isomorphic to the classifying stack $B(\mathbb{Z}/2)$ since every elliptic curve corresponds to a double cover of $\mathbb{P}^1$, so the $\mathbb{Z}/2$-action on the point corresponds to the involution of these two branches of the covering. There are a few special points corresponding to elliptic curves with $j$-invariant equal to $1728$ and $0$ where the automorphism groups are of order 4, 6, respectively. One point in the Fundamental domain with stabilizer of order $4$ corresponds to $\tau = i$, and the points corresponding to the stabilizer of order $6$ correspond to $\tau = e^{2\pi i / 3}, e^{\pi i / 3}$.

==== Representing involutions of plane curves ====
Given a plane curve by its Weierstrass equation
$$y^2 = x^3 + ax + b$$
and a solution $(t,s)$, generically for j-invariant $j \neq 0,1728$, there is the $\mathbb{Z}/2$-involution sending $(t,s)\mapsto (t,-s)$. In the special case of a curve with complex multiplication
$$y^2 = x^3 + ax$$
there the $\mathbb{Z}/4$-involution sending $(t,s)\mapsto (-t,\sqrt{-1}\cdot s)$. The other special case is when $a = 0$, so a curve of the form
$$y^2 = x^3 + b$$
there is the $\mathbb{Z}/6$-involution sending $(t,s) \mapsto (\zeta_3 t,-s)$ where $\zeta_3$ is the third root of unity $e^{2\pi i / 3}$.

=== Fundamental domain and visualization ===
There is a subset of the upper-half plane called the Fundamental domain which contains every isomorphism class of elliptic curves. It is the subset
$$D = \{z \in \mathfrak{h} : |z| \geq 1 \text{ and } \text{Re}(z) \leq 1/2 \}$$
It is useful to consider this space because it helps visualize the stack $\mathcal{M}_{1,1}$. From the quotient map
$$\mathfrak{h} \to \text{SL}_2(\mathbb{Z})\backslash \mathfrak{h}$$
the image of $D$ is surjective and its interior is injective. Also, the points on the boundary can be identified with their mirror image under the involution sending $\text{Re}(z) \mapsto -\text{Re}(z)$, so $\mathcal{M}_{1,1}$ can be visualized as the projective curve $\mathbb{P}^1$ with a point removed at infinity.

=== Line bundles and modular functions ===
There are line bundles $\mathcal{L}^{\otimes k}$ over the moduli stack $\mathcal{M}_{1,1}$ whose sections correspond to modular functions $f$ on the upper-half plane $\mathfrak{h}$. On $\mathbb{C}\times\mathfrak{h}$ there are $\text{SL}_2(\mathbb{Z})$-actions compatible with the action on $\mathfrak{h}$ given by
$$\text{SL}_2(\mathbb{Z}) \times {\displaystyle \mathbb {C} \times {\mathfrak {h}}} \to {\displaystyle \mathbb {C} \times {\mathfrak {h}}}$$
The degree $k$ action is given by
$$\begin{pmatrix}
a & b \\
c & d
\end{pmatrix} : (z,\tau ) \mapsto \left( (c\tau + d)^kz, \frac{a\tau + b}{c\tau + d} \right)$$
hence the trivial line bundle $\mathbb{C}\times\mathfrak{h} \to \mathfrak{h}$ with the degree $k$ action descends to a unique line bundle denoted $\mathcal{L}^{\otimes k}$. Notice the action on the factor $\mathbb{C}$ is a representation of $\text{SL}_2(\mathbb{Z})$ on $\mathbb{Z}$ hence such representations can be tensored together, showing $\mathcal{L}^{\otimes k} \otimes \mathcal{L}^{\otimes l} \cong \mathcal{L}^{\otimes (k + l)}$. The sections of $\mathcal{L}^{\otimes k}$ are then functions sections $f \in \Gamma(\mathbb{C}\times \mathfrak{h})$ compatible with the action of $\text{SL}_2(\mathbb{Z})$, or equivalently, functions $f:\mathfrak{h} \to \mathbb{C}$ such that
$$f\left(
\begin{pmatrix}
a & b \\
c & d \end{pmatrix} \cdot \tau
\right) = (c\tau + d)^kf(\tau)$$
This is exactly the condition for a holomorphic function to be modular.

==== Modular forms ====
The modular forms are the modular functions which can be extended to the compactification
$$\overline{\mathcal{L}^{\otimes k}} \to \overline{\mathcal{M}}_{1,1}$$
this is because in order to compactify the stack $\mathcal{M}_{1,1}$, a point at infinity must be added, which is done through a gluing process by gluing the $q$-disk (where a modular function has its $q$-expansion).

=== Universal curves ===
Constructing the universal curves $\mathcal{E} \to \mathcal{M}_{1,1}$ is a two step process: (1) construct a versal curve $\mathcal{E}_{\mathfrak{h}} \to \mathfrak{h}$ and then (2) show this behaves well with respect to the $\text{SL}_2(\mathbb{Z})$-action on $\mathfrak{h}$. Combining these two actions together yields the quotient stack
$$[(\text{SL}_2(\mathbb{Z}) \ltimes \mathbb{Z}^2 )\backslash \mathbb{C}\times\mathfrak{h}]$$

==== Versal curve ====
Every rank 2 $\mathbb{Z}$-lattice in $\mathbb{C}$ induces a canonical $\mathbb{Z}^{2}$-action on $\mathbb{C}$. As before, since every lattice is homothetic to a lattice of the form $(1,\tau)$ then the action $(m,n)$ sends a point $z \in \mathbb{C}$ to
$$(m ,n)\cdot z \mapsto z + m\cdot 1 + n\cdot\tau$$
Because the $\tau$ in $\mathfrak{h}$ can vary in this action, there is an induced $\mathbb{Z}^{2}$-action on $\mathbb{C}\times\mathfrak{h}$
$$(m ,n)\cdot (z, \tau) \mapsto (z + m\cdot 1 + n\cdot\tau, \tau)$$
giving the quotient space
$$\mathcal{E}_\mathfrak{h} \to \mathfrak{h}$$
by projecting onto $\mathfrak{h}$.

==== SL_{2}-action on Z^{2} ====
There is a $\text{SL}_2(\mathbb{Z})$-action on $\mathbb{Z}^{2}$ which is compatible with the action on $\mathfrak{h}$, meaning given a point $z \in \mathfrak{h}$ and a $g \in \text{SL}_2(\mathbb{Z})$, the new lattice $g\cdot z$ and an induced action from $\mathbb{Z}^2 \cdot g$, which behaves as expected. This action is given by
$$\begin{pmatrix}
a & b \\
c & d
\end{pmatrix} : (m, n) \mapsto (m,n)\cdot \begin{pmatrix}
a & b \\
c & d
\end{pmatrix}$$
which is matrix multiplication on the right, so
$$(m,n)\cdot \begin{pmatrix}
a & b \\
c & d
\end{pmatrix} = (
am + cn, bm + dn
)$$

== See also ==
- Fundamental domain
- Homothety
- Level structure (algebraic geometry)
- Moduli of abelian varieties
- Shimura variety
- Modular curve
- Elliptic cohomology
