= Rosenhain =

Rosenhain is surname of:

- Johann Georg Rosenhain (1816 - 1887), German mathematician
- Jakob (Jacob, Jacques) Rosenhain (1813, Mannheim – 1894, Baden-Baden), a Jewish German pianist and composer
- Walter Rosenhain (1875, Berlin – 1934), an Australian metallurgist

== See also ==
- Rosenhayn
