= Harnack's curve theorem =

Number of connected components an algebraic curve can have

The elliptic curve (smooth degree 3) on the left is an M-curve, as it has the maximum (2) components, while the curve on the right has only 1 component.

In real algebraic geometry, Harnack's curve theorem, named after Axel Harnack, gives the possible numbers of connected components that an algebraic curve can have, in terms of the degree of the curve. For any algebraic curve of degree m in the real projective plane, the number of components c is bounded by

$$\frac{1-(-1)^m}{2} \le c \le \frac{(m-1)(m-2)}{2}+1.\$$

The maximum number is one more than the maximum genus of a curve of degree m, attained when the curve is nonsingular. Moreover, any number of components in this range of possible values can be attained.

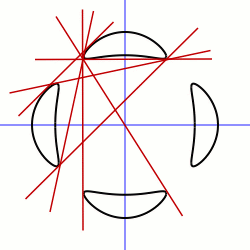
The Trott curve, shown here with 7 of its bitangents, is a quartic (degree 4) M-curve, attaining the maximum (4) components for a curve of that degree.

A curve which attains the maximum number of real components is called an M-curve (from "maximum") – for example, an elliptic curve with two components, such as $y^2=x^3-x,$ or the Trott curve, a quartic with four components, are examples of M-curves.

This theorem formed the background to Hilbert's sixteenth problem.

In a recent development a Harnack curve is shown to be a curve whose amoeba has area equal to the Newton polygon of the polynomial P, which is called the characteristic curve of dimer models, and every Harnack curve is the spectral curve of some dimer model.(Mikhalkin 2001)(Kenyon, Okounkov & Sheffield (2006))
