= Shiota =

Shiota (written: 塩田 or 潮田) is a Japanese surname. Notable people with the surname include:

- Akihiko Shiota (塩田 明彦; born 1961), Japanese film director and screenwriter
- Chiharu Shiota (塩田 千春; born 1972), Japanese artist
- Hitoshi Shiota (塩田 仁史; born 1981), Japanese footballer
- Reiko Shiota (潮田 玲子; born 1983), Japanese baseball player
- Sayo Shiota (塩田 沙代; born 1989), Japanese handball player
- Takahiro Shiota (塩田 隆比呂), Japanese mathematician
- Takeo Shiota (塩田 武雄; 1881–1943), Japanese-American landscape architect

== Fictional characters ==
- Nagisa Shiota (潮田 渚), a character in the Assassination Classroom anime and manga

== See also ==
- Shiota, Saga, a former town in Saga Prefecture, Japan
- 6337 Shiota, a main-belt asteroid
- Yantian, Shenzhen, Guangdong, China
