= Abelian integral =

Generalization of elliptic integrals

In mathematics, an abelian integral, named after the Norwegian mathematician Niels Henrik Abel, is an integral in the complex plane of the form

$$\int_{z_0}^z R(x,w) \, dx,$$

where $R(x,w)$ is an arbitrary rational function of the two variables $x$ and $w$, which are related by the equation

$$F(x,w)=0,$$

where $F(x,w)$ is an irreducible polynomial in $w$,

$$F(x,w)\equiv\varphi_n(x)w^n+\cdots+\varphi_1(x)w +\varphi_0\left(x\right),$$

whose coefficients $\varphi_j(x)$, $j=0,1,\ldots,n$ are rational functions of $x$. The value of an abelian integral depends not only on the integration limits, but also on the path along which the integral is taken; it is thus a multivalued function of $z$.

Abelian integrals are natural generalizations of elliptic integrals, which arise when

$$F(x,w)=w^2-P(x), \,$$

where $P\left(x\right)$ is a polynomial of degree 3 or 4. Another special case of an abelian integral is a hyperelliptic integral, where $P(x)$, in the formula above, is a polynomial of degree greater than 4.

== History ==
The theory of abelian integrals originated with a paper by Abel published in 1841. This paper was written during his stay in Paris in 1826 and presented to Augustin-Louis Cauchy in October of the same year. This theory, later fully developed by others, was one of the crowning achievements of nineteenth century mathematics and has had a major impact on the development of modern mathematics. In more abstract and geometric language, it is contained in the concept of abelian variety, or more precisely in the way an algebraic curve can be mapped into abelian varieties. Abelian integrals were later connected to the prominent mathematician David Hilbert's 16th problem, and they continue to be considered one of the foremost challenges in contemporary mathematics.

== Modern view ==
In the theory of Riemann surfaces, an abelian integral is a function related to the indefinite integral of a differential of the first kind. Suppose we are given a Riemann surface $S$ and on it a differential 1-form $\omega$ that is everywhere holomorphic on $S$, and fix a point $P_0$ on $S$, from which to integrate. We can regard

$$\int_{P_0}^P \omega$$

as a multi-valued function $f\left(P\right)$, or (better) an honest function of the chosen path $C$ drawn on $S$ from $P_0$ to $P$. Since $S$ will in general be multiply connected, one should specify $C$, but the value will in fact only depend on the homology class of $C$.

In the case of $S$ a compact Riemann surface of genus 1, i.e. an elliptic curve, such functions are the elliptic integrals.

Such functions were first introduced to study hyperelliptic integrals, i.e., for the case where $S$ is a hyperelliptic curve. This is a natural step in the theory of integration to the case of integrals involving algebraic functions $\sqrt{A}$, where $A$ is a polynomial of degree $>4$. The first major insights of the theory were given by Abel; it was later formulated in terms of the Jacobian variety $J\left(S\right)$. Choice of $P_0$ gives rise to a standard holomorphic function

$$S\to J(S)$$

of complex manifolds. It has the defining property that the holomorphic 1-forms on $S\to J(S)$, of which there are g independent ones if g is the genus of S, pull back to a basis for the differentials of the first kind on S.

== See also ==
- Abelian differential
