= Addition theorem =

Result that expresses a function f(x + y) in terms of f(x) and f(y)

In mathematics, an addition theorem is a formula such as that for the exponential function:

e^{x + y} = e^{x} · e^{y},

that expresses, for a particular function f, f(x + y) in terms of f(x) and f(y). Slightly more generally, as is the case with the trigonometric functions sin and cos, several functions may be involved; this is more apparent than real, in that case, since there cos is an algebraic function of sin (in other words, we usually take their functions both as defined on the unit circle).

The scope of the idea of an addition theorem was fully explored in the nineteenth century, prompted by the discovery of the addition theorem for elliptic functions. To "classify" addition theorems it is necessary to put some restriction on the type of function G admitted, such that

F(x + y) = G(F(x), F(y)).

In this identity one can assume that F and G are vector-valued (have several components). An algebraic addition theorem is one in which G can be taken to be a vector of polynomials, in some set of variables. The conclusion of the mathematicians of the time was that the theory of abelian functions essentially exhausted the interesting possibilities: considered as a functional equation to be solved with polynomials, or indeed rational functions or algebraic functions, there were no further types of solution.

In more contemporary language this appears as part of the theory of algebraic groups, dealing with commutative groups. The connected, projective variety examples are indeed exhausted by abelian functions, as is shown by a number of results characterising an abelian variety by rather weak conditions on its group law. The so-called quasi-abelian functions are all known to come from extensions of abelian varieties by commutative affine group varieties. Therefore, the old conclusions about the scope of global algebraic addition theorems can be said to hold. A more modern aspect is the theory of formal groups.

== See also ==
- Timeline of abelian varieties
- Addition theorem for spherical harmonics
- Mordell–Weil theorem
