= Charles Auguste Briot =

French mathematician (1817–1882)

- Born: 19 July 1817; Franche-Comté, France
- Died: 20 September 1882 (aged 65); Bourg-d'Ault, France
- Citizenship: France
- Awards: Poncelet Prize (1882)
- Scientific career
- Fields: Mathematics
- Thesis: Sur le mouvement d'un corps solide autour d'un point fixe (1842)

Charles Auguste Briot (19 July 1817 St Hippolyte, Doubs, Franche-Comté, France – 20 September 1882 Bourg-d'Ault, France) was a French mathematician who worked on elliptic functions. The Académie des Sciences awarded him the Poncelet Prize in 1882.

== See also ==
- Holomorphic function
- Timeline of abelian varieties
