= Irregularity of a surface =

In mathematics, the irregularity of a complex surface X is the Hodge number $h^{0,1}= \dim H^1(\mathcal{O}_X)$, usually denoted by q. The irregularity of an algebraic surface is sometimes defined to be this Hodge number, and sometimes defined to be the dimension of the Picard variety, which is the same in characteristic 0 but can be smaller in positive characteristic.

The name "irregularity" comes from the fact that for the first surfaces investigated in detail, the smooth complex surfaces in $\mathbb P^3$, the irregularity happens to vanish. The irregularity then appeared as a new "correction" term measuring the difference $p_g - p_a$ of the geometric genus and the arithmetic genus of more complicated surfaces. Surfaces are sometimes called regular or irregular depending on whether or not the irregularity vanishes.

For a complex analytic manifold X of general dimension, the Hodge number $h^{0,1}= \dim H^1(\mathcal{O}_X)$ is called the irregularity of $X$, and is denoted by q.

== Complex surfaces ==
For non-singular complex projective (or Kähler) surfaces, the following numbers are all equal:

- The irregularity;
- The dimension of the Albanese variety;
- The dimension of the Picard variety;
- The Hodge number $h^{0,1}= \dim H^1(\Omega^0_X)$;
- The Hodge number $h^{1,0}= \dim H^0(\Omega^1_X)$;
- The difference $p_g - p_a$ of the geometric genus and the arithmetic genus.

For surfaces in positive characteristic, or for non-Kähler complex surfaces, the numbers above need not all be equal.

Henri Poincaré proved that for complex projective surfaces the dimension of the Picard variety is equal to the Hodge number h^{0,1}, and the same is true for all compact Kähler surfaces. The irregularity of smooth compact Kähler surfaces is invariant under bimeromorphic transformations.

For general compact complex surfaces the two Hodge numbers h^{1,0} and h^{0,1} need not be equal, but h^{0,1} is either h^{1,0} or h^{1,0}+1, and is equal to h^{1,0} for compact Kähler surfaces.

== Positive characteristic ==
Over fields of positive characteristic, the relation between q (defined as the dimension of the Picard or Albanese variety), and the Hodge numbers h^{0,1} and h^{1,0} is more complicated, and any two of them can be different.

There is a canonical map from a surface F to its Albanese variety A which induces a homomorphism from the cotangent space of the Albanese variety (of dimension q) to H^{1,0}(F). Jun-Ichi Igusa found that this is injective, so that $q\le h^{1,0}$, but shortly after found a surface in characteristic 2 with $h^{1,0}= h^{0,1} = 2$ and Picard variety of dimension 1, so that q can be strictly less than both Hodge numbers. In positive characteristic neither Hodge number is always bounded by the other. Serre showed that it is possible for h^{1,0} to vanish while h^{0,1} is positive, while Mumford showed that for Enriques surfaces in characteristic 2 it is possible for h^{0,1} to vanish while h^{1,0} is positive.

Alexander Grothendieck gave a complete description of the relation of q to $h^{0,1}$in all characteristics. The dimension of the tangent space to the Picard scheme (at any point) is equal to $h^{0,1}$. In characteristic 0 a result of Pierre Cartier showed that all groups schemes of finite type are non-singular, so the dimension of their tangent space is their dimension. On the other hand, in positive characteristic it is possible for a group scheme to be non-reduced at every point so that the dimension is less than the dimension of any tangent space, which is what happens in Igusa's example. Mumford shows that the tangent space to the Picard variety is the subspace of H^{0,1} annihilated by all Bockstein operations from H^{0,1} to H^{0,2}, so the irregularity q is equal to h^{0,1} if and only if all these Bockstein operations vanish.
