= Bitangents of a quartic =

28 lines which touch a general quartic plane curve in two places

The Trott curve and seven of its bitangents. The others are symmetric with respect to 90° rotations through the origin.

The Trott curve with all 28 bitangents.

In the theory of algebraic plane curves, a general quartic plane curve has 28 bitangent lines, lines that are tangent to the curve in two places. These lines exist in the complex projective plane, but it is possible to define quartic curves for which all 28 of these lines have real numbers as their coordinates and therefore belong to the Euclidean plane.

An explicit quartic with twenty-eight real bitangents was first given by Plücker (1839). As Plücker showed, the number of real bitangents of any quartic must be 28, 16, or a number less than 9. Another quartic with 28 real bitangents can be formed by the locus of centers of ellipses with fixed axis lengths, tangent to two non-parallel lines. Shioda (1995) gave a different construction of a quartic with twenty-eight bitangents, formed by projecting a cubic surface; twenty-seven of the bitangents to Shioda's curve are real while the twenty-eighth is the line at infinity in the projective plane.

== Example ==
The Trott curve, another curve with 28 real bitangents, is the set of points (x,y) satisfying the degree four polynomial equation

$$\displaystyle 144(x^4+y^4)-225(x^2+y^2)+350x^2y^2+81=0.$$

These points form a nonsingular quartic curve that has genus three and that has twenty-eight real bitangents.

Like the examples of Plücker and of Blum and Guinand, the Trott curve has four separated ovals, the maximum number for a curve of degree four, and hence is an M-curve. The four ovals can be grouped into six different pairs of ovals; for each pair of ovals there are four bitangents touching both ovals in the pair, two that separate the two ovals, and two that do not. Additionally, each oval bounds a nonconvex region of the plane and has one bitangent spanning the nonconvex portion of its boundary.

== Connections to other structures ==
The dual curve to a quartic curve has 28 real ordinary double points, dual to the 28 bitangents of the primal curve.

The 28 bitangents of a quartic may also be placed in correspondence with symbols of the form

$$\begin{bmatrix}
a & b & c \\
d & e & f \\
\end{bmatrix}$$

where a, b, c, d, e, f are all zero or one and where

$ad + be + cf = 1\ (\operatorname{mod}\ 2).$

There are 64 choices for a, b, c, d, e, f, but only 28 of these choices produce an odd sum. One may also interpret a, b, c as the homogeneous coordinates of a point of the Fano plane and d, e, f as the coordinates of a line in the same finite projective plane; the condition that the sum is odd is equivalent to requiring that the point and the line do not touch each other, and there are 28 different pairs of a point and a line that do not touch.

The points and lines of the Fano plane that are disjoint from a non-incident point-line pair form a triangle, and the bitangents of a quartic have been considered as being in correspondence with the 28 triangles of the Fano plane. The Levi graph of the Fano plane is the Heawood graph, in which the triangles of the Fano plane are represented by 6-cycles. The 28 6-cycles of the Heawood graph in turn correspond to the 28 vertices of the Coxeter graph.

The 28 bitangents of a quartic also correspond to pairs of the 56 lines on a degree-2 del Pezzo surface, and to the 28 odd theta characteristics.

The 27 lines on the cubic and the 28 bitangents on a quartic, together with the 120 tritangent planes of a canonic sextic curve of genus 4, form a "trinity" in the sense of Vladimir Arnold, specifically a form of McKay correspondence, and can be related to many further objects, including E_{7} and E_{8}, as discussed at trinities.
