= I-bundle =

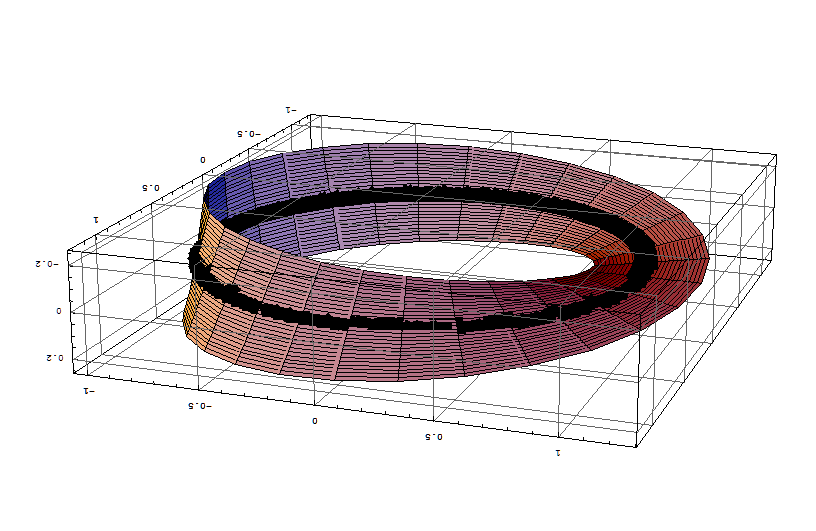
A Möbius band is a non-orientable I-bundle. The dark line is the base for a set of transversal lines that are homeomorphic to the fiber and that each touch the edge of the band twice.

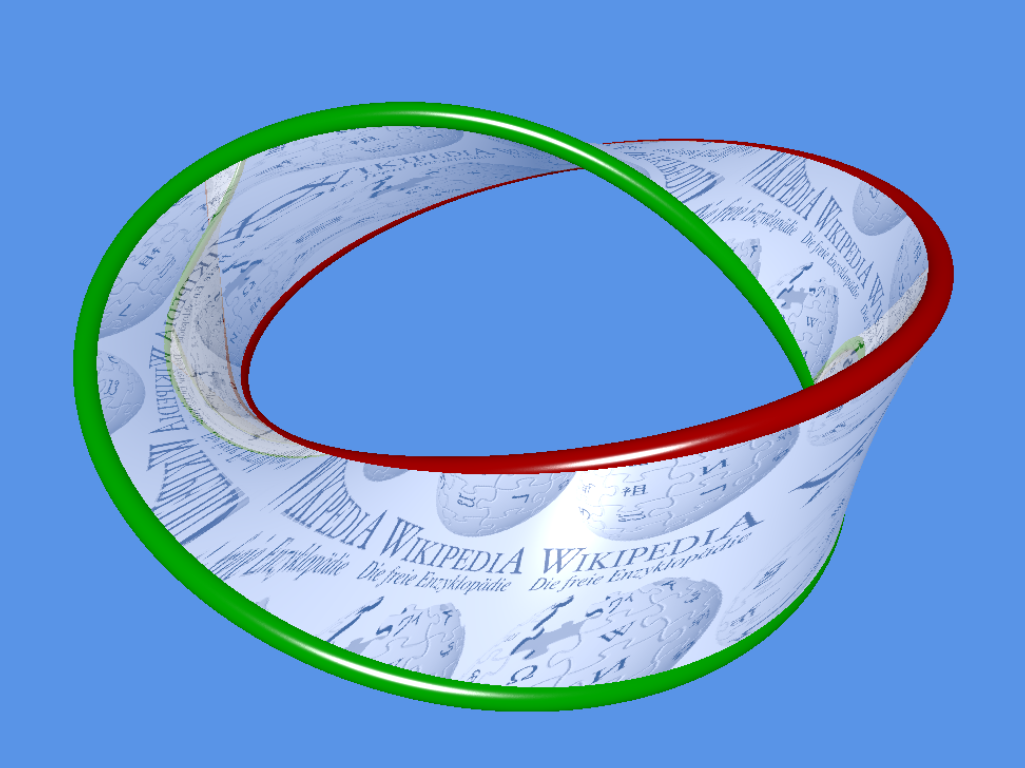
An annulus is an orientable I-bundle. This example is embedded in 3-space with an even number of twists

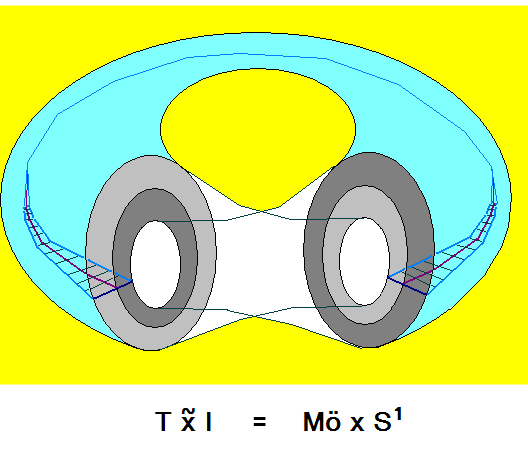
This image represents the twisted I-bundle over the 2-torus, which is also fibered as a Möbius strip times the circle. So, this space is also a circle bundle

In mathematics, an I-bundle is a fiber bundle whose fiber is an interval and whose base is a manifold. Any kind of interval, open, closed, semi-open, semi-closed, open-bounded, compact, even rays, can be the fiber. An I-bundle is said to be twisted if it is not trivial.

Two simple examples of I-bundles are the annulus and the Möbius band, the only two possible I-bundles over the circle $S^1$. The annulus is a trivial or untwisted bundle because it corresponds to the Cartesian product $S^1\times I$, and the Möbius band is a non-trivial or twisted bundle. Both bundles are 2-manifolds, but the annulus is an orientable manifold while the Möbius band is a non-orientable manifold.

There are only two kinds of I-bundles when the base manifold is any surface but the Klein bottle $K$. That surface has three I-bundles: the trivial bundle $K\times I$ and two twisted bundles.

Together with the Seifert fiber spaces, I-bundles are fundamental elementary building blocks for the description of three-dimensional spaces. These observations are simple well known facts on elementary 3-manifolds.

Line bundles are both I-bundles and vector bundles of rank one. When considering I-bundles, one is interested mostly in their topological properties and not their possible vector properties, as one might be for line bundles.

== See also ==
- Khovanov homology
