= Ruggiero Torelli =

Italian mathematician (1884–1915)

Ruggiero Torelli (7 June 1884 in Naples – 9 September 1915) was an Italian mathematician who introduced Torelli's theorem, a classical result of algebraic geometry over the complex number field.

== Publications ==
- Torelli, Ruggiero (1913), "Sulle varietà di Jacobi" [On Jacobi varieties], Atti della Reale Accademia dei Lincei. Rendiconti, Serie V, 22: 98–103, JFM 44.0655.03
- Torelli, Ruggiero (1913), "Sulle varietà di Jacobi. Nota II" [On Jacobi varieties. Note II], Atti della Reale Accademia dei Lincei. Rendiconti, Serie V, 22: 437–441, JFM 44.0655.03
- Torelli, Ruggiero (1995), Ciliberto, Ciro; Ribenboim, Paulo; Sernesi, Edoardo (eds.), Collected papers of Ruggiero Torelli, Queen's Papers in Pure and Applied Mathematics, vol. 101, Kingston, ON: Queen's University, ISBN 0-88911-707-1, MR 1374332, Zbl 0962.01505

== See also ==
- Torelli group
