= Complex Lie group =

Lie group whose manifold is complex and whose group operation is holomorphic

In geometry, a complex Lie group is a Lie group over the complex numbers; i.e., it is a complex-analytic manifold that is also a group in such a way $G \times G \to G, (x, y) \mapsto x y^{-1}$ is holomorphic. Basic examples are $\operatorname{GL}_n(\mathbb{C})$, the general linear groups over the complex numbers. A connected compact complex Lie group is precisely a complex torus (not to be confused with the complex Lie group $\mathbb C^*$). Any finite group may be given the structure of a complex Lie group. A complex semisimple Lie group is a linear algebraic group.

The Lie algebra of a complex Lie group is a complex Lie algebra.

== Examples ==
- A finite-dimensional vector space over the complex numbers (in particular, complex Lie algebra) is a complex Lie group in an obvious way.
- A connected compact complex Lie group A of dimension g is of the form $\mathbb{C}^g/L$, a complex torus, where L is a discrete subgroup of rank 2g. Indeed, its Lie algebra $\mathfrak{a}$ can be shown to be abelian and then $\operatorname{exp}: \mathfrak{a} \to A$ is a surjective morphism of complex Lie groups, showing A is of the form described.
- $\mathbb{C} \to \mathbb{C}^*, z \mapsto e^z$ is an example of a surjective homomorphism of complex Lie groups that does not come from a morphism of algebraic groups. Since $\mathbb{C}^* = \operatorname{GL}_1(\mathbb{C})$, this is also an example of a representation of a complex Lie group that is not algebraic.
- Let X be a compact complex manifold. Then, analogous to the real case, $\operatorname{Aut}(X)$ is a complex Lie group whose Lie algebra is the space $\Gamma(X, TX)$ of holomorphic vector fields on X:.
- Let K be a connected compact Lie group. Then there exists a unique connected complex Lie group G such that (i) $\operatorname{Lie} (G) = \operatorname{Lie} (K) \otimes_{\mathbb{R}} \mathbb{C}$, and (ii) K is a maximal compact subgroup of G. It is called the complexification of K. For example, $\operatorname{GL}_n(\mathbb{C})$ is the complexification of the unitary group. If K is acting on a compact Kähler manifold X, then the action of K extends to that of G.

== Linear algebraic group associated to a complex semisimple Lie group ==
Let G be a complex semisimple Lie group. Then G admits a natural structure of a linear algebraic group as follows: let $A$ be the ring of holomorphic functions f on G such that $G \cdot f$ spans a finite-dimensional vector space inside the ring of holomorphic functions on G (here G acts by left translation: $g \cdot f(h) = f(g^{-1}h)$). Then $\operatorname{Spec}(A)$ is the linear algebraic group that, when viewed as a complex manifold, is the original G. More concretely, choose a faithful representation $\rho : G \to GL(V)$ of G. Then $\rho(G)$ is Zariski-closed in $GL(V)$.
