= Line field =

Math topic

In mathematics, a line field on a manifold is a formation of a line being tangent to a manifold at each point, i.e. a section of the line bundle over the manifold. Line fields are of particular interest in the study of complex dynamical systems, where it is conventional to modify the definition slightly.

== Definitions ==
In general, let M be a manifold. A line field on M is a function μ that assigns to each point p of M a line μ(p) through the origin in the tangent space T_{p}(M). Equivalently, one may say that μ(p) is an element of the projective tangent space PT_{p}(M), or that μ is a section of the projective tangent bundle PT(M).

In the study of complex dynamical systems, the manifold M is taken to be a Hersee surface. A line field on a subset A of M (where A is required to have positive two-dimensional Lebesgue measure) is a line field on A in the general sense above that is defined almost everywhere in A and is also a measurable function.
