= Torelli theorem =

Describes when a compact Riemann surface is determined by its Jacobian variety

In mathematics, the Torelli theorem, named after Ruggiero Torelli, is a classical result of algebraic geometry over the complex number field, stating that a non-singular projective algebraic curve (compact Riemann surface) C is determined by its Jacobian variety J(C), when the latter is given in the form of a principally polarized abelian variety. In other words, the complex torus J(C), with certain 'markings', is enough to recover C. The same statement holds over any algebraically closed field. From more precise information on the constructed isomorphism of the curves it follows that if the canonically principally polarized Jacobian varieties of curves of genus $\geq 2$ are k-isomorphic for k any perfect field, so are the curves.

This result has had many important extensions. It can be recast to read that a certain natural morphism, the period mapping, from the moduli space of curves of a fixed genus, to a moduli space of abelian varieties, is injective (on geometric points). Generalizations are in two directions. Firstly, to geometric questions about that morphism, for example the local Torelli theorem. Secondly, to other period mappings. A case that has been investigated deeply is for K3 surfaces (by Viktor S. Kulikov, Ilya Pyatetskii-Shapiro, Igor Shafarevich and Fedor Bogomolov) and hyperkähler manifolds (by Misha Verbitsky, Eyal Markman and Daniel Huybrechts).
