= Differential of the first kind =

Term used in the theories of Riemann surfaces and algebraic curves

In mathematics, differential of the first kind is a traditional term used in the theories of Riemann surfaces (more generally, complex manifolds) and algebraic curves (more generally, algebraic varieties) for everywhere-regular differential 1-forms. Given a complex manifold M, a differential of the first kind ω is therefore the same thing as a 1-form that is everywhere holomorphic.

The dimension of the space of differentials of the first kind, by means of this identification, is the Hodge number

h^{1,0}.

The differentials of the first kind, when integrated along paths, give rise to integrals that generalise the elliptic integrals to all curves over the complex numbers. They include for example the hyperelliptic integrals of type

$$\int\frac{x^k \, dx}{\sqrt{Q(x)}}$$

where Q is a square-free polynomial of any given degree > 4. The allowable power k has to be determined by analysis of the possible pole at the point at infinity on the corresponding hyperelliptic curve. When this is done, one finds that the condition is

k ≤ g − 1,

or in other words, k at most 1 for degree of Q 5 or 6, at most 2 for degree 7 or 8, and so on (as g = [(1+ deg Q)/2]).

Quite generally, as this example illustrates, for a compact Riemann surface or algebraic curve, the Hodge number is the genus g. For the case of algebraic surfaces, this is the quantity known classically as the irregularity q. It is also, in general, the dimension of the Albanese variety, which takes the place of the Jacobian variety.

== Differentials of the second and third kind ==
The traditional terminology also included differentials of the second kind and of the third kind.

The Weierstrass zeta function was called an integral of the second kind in elliptic function theory; it is a logarithmic derivative of a theta function, and therefore has simple poles, with integer residues. The decomposition of a (meromorphic) elliptic function into pieces of 'three kinds' parallels the representation as (i) a constant, plus (ii) a linear combination of translates of the Weierstrass zeta function, plus (iii) a function with arbitrary poles but no residues at them.

On the other hand, a meromorphic abelian differential of the second kind has traditionally been one with residues at all poles being zero. One of the third kind is one where all poles are simple. There is a higher-dimensional analogue available, using the Poincaré residue.

== Reciprocity laws ==
Suppose that a compact Riemann surface $S$ is given, along with a collection of cycles $\delta_1,\ldots,\delta_{2g}$ forming a basis of $H_1(S,\mathbb Z)$, issuing from a common base point $s_0\in S$. Let $\omega$ be a holomorphic differential on $S$, and $\eta$ a meromorphic differential with only simple poles, at $s_k\in S$. Letting
$$\Pi_k = \int_{\delta_k}\omega$$
$$N_k=\int_{\delta_k}\eta,$$
we have the Abel reciprocity law for differentials of the first and third kind
$$\sum_{k=1}^g (\Pi_kN_{g+k} - \Pi_{g+k}N_k) = 2\pi i \sum_k\operatorname{Res}_{s_k}(\eta)\int_{s_0}^{s_k}\omega.$$
In the special case when $\eta$ is also a differential of the first kind, this recovers Riemann's first bilinear relation.

== See also ==
- Abel–Jacobi map
- Logarithmic form
