= Isogeny =

Type of map between algebraic groups

In mathematics, particularly in algebraic geometry, an isogeny between two abelian varieties is a surjective homomorphism with a finite kernel.

In the case of abelian varieties, then any morphism f : A → B of the underlying algebraic varieties which is surjective with finite fibres is automatically an isogeny, provided that f(1_{A}) = 1_{B}. Such an isogeny f then provides a group homomorphism between the groups of k-valued points of A and B, for any field k over which f is defined.

The terms "isogeny" and "isogenous" come from the Greek word ισογενη-ς, meaning "equal in kind or nature". The term "isogeny" was introduced by Weil; before this, the term "isomorphism" was somewhat confusingly used for what is now called an isogeny.

== Degree of isogeny ==
Let f : A → B be isogeny between two algebraic groups. This mapping induces a pullback mapping f* : K(B) → K(A) between their rational function fields. Since the mapping is nontrivial, it is a field embedding and $\operatorname{im} f^*$ is a subfield of K(A). The degree of the extension $K(A) / \operatorname{im} f^*$ is called degree of isogeny:

$$\deg f := [K(A): \operatorname{im} f^*]$$

Properties of degree:

- If $f:X \rightarrow Y$, $g:Y \rightarrow Z$ are isogenies of algebraic groups, then: $\deg (g\circ f)=\deg g \cdot \deg f$
- If $char \; K \nmid \deg f$, then $\deg f = |\ker\; f|$

== Case of abelian varieties ==
Isogenous elliptic curves to E can be obtained by quotienting E by finite subgroups, here subgroups of the 4-torsion subgroup.

For abelian varieties, such as elliptic curves, this notion can also be formulated as follows:

Let E_{1} and E_{2} be abelian varieties of the same dimension over a field k. An isogeny between E_{1} and E_{2} is a dense morphism f : E_{1} → E_{2} of varieties that preserves basepoints (i.e. f maps the identity point on E_{1} to that on E_{2}).

This is equivalent to the above notion, as every dense morphism between two abelian varieties of the same dimension is automatically surjective with finite fibres, and if it preserves identities then it is a homomorphism of groups.

Two abelian varieties E_{1} and E_{2} are called isogenous if there is an isogeny E_{1} → E_{2}. This can be shown to be an equivalence relation; in the case of elliptic curves, symmetry is due to the existence of the dual isogeny. As above, every isogeny induces homomorphisms of the groups of the k-valued points of the abelian varieties.

== Tate's isogeny theorem ==
In mathematics, Tate's isogeny theorem, proved by Tate (1966), states that two abelian varieties over a finite field are isogenous if and only if their Tate modules are isomorphic (as Galois representations).

== See also ==
- Abelian varieties up to isogeny
- Selmer group
- Honda–Tate theorem
