= Takahiro Shiota =

Japanese mathematician

- Education: Harvard University
- Scientific career
- Fields: Mathematics
- Workplaces: Kyoto University

Takahiro Shiota (塩田 隆比呂, Shiota Takahiro) is a Japanese mathematician at Kyoto University. In 1986, he proved Novikov's conjecture about the Riemann–Schottky problem by characterization of Jacobian varieties.

Shiota obtained his doctorate at Harvard University in 1984.
