= Weddle surface =

Quartic surface in projective 3-space

In algebraic geometry, a Weddle surface, introduced by Thomas Weddle (1850, footnote on page 69), is a quartic surface in 3-dimensional projective space, given by the locus of vertices of the family of cones passing through 6 points in general position.

Weddle surfaces have 6 nodes and are birational to Kummer surfaces.
