= Thomas Weddle =

Thomas Weddle (30 November 1817 Stamfordham, Northumberland – 4 December 1853 Bagshot) was a mathematician who introduced the Weddle surface. He was mathematics professor at the Royal Military College, Sandhurst.

Weddle's Rule is a method of integration, the Newton–Cotes formula with N=6.
