= Moduli of abelian varieties =

Abelian varieties are a natural generalization of elliptic curves to higher dimensions. However, unlike the case of elliptic curves, there is no well-behaved stack playing the role of a moduli stack for higher-dimensional abelian varieties. One can solve this problem by constructing a moduli stack of abelian varieties equipped with extra structure, such as a principal polarisation. Just as there is a moduli stack of elliptic curves over $\mathbb{C}$ constructed as a stacky quotient of the upper-half plane by the action of $SL_2(\mathbb{Z})$, there is a moduli space of principally polarised abelian varieties given as a stacky quotient of Siegel upper half-space by the symplectic group $\operatorname{Sp}_{2g}(\mathbb{Z})$. By adding even more extra structure, such as a level n structure, one can go further and obtain a fine moduli space.

== Constructions over the complex numbers ==
=== Principally polarized Abelian varieties ===
Recall that the Siegel upper half-space $H_g$ is the set of symmetric $g \times g$ complex matrices whose imaginary part is positive definite. This an open subset in the space of $g\times g$ symmetric matrices. Notice that if $g=1$, $H_g$ consists of complex numbers with positive imaginary part, and is thus the upper half plane, which appears prominently in the study of elliptic curves. In general, any point $\Omega \in H_g$ gives a complex torus

$X_\Omega = \mathbb{C}^g/(\Omega\mathbb{Z}^g + \mathbb{Z}^g)$

with a principal polarization $H_\Omega$ from the matrix $\Omega^{-1}$^{page 34}. It turns out all principally polarized Abelian varieties arise this way, giving $H_g$ the structure of a parameter space for all principally polarized Abelian varieties. But, there exists an equivalence where

$X_\Omega \cong X_{\Omega'} \iff \Omega = M\Omega'$ for $M \in \operatorname{Sp}_{2g}(\mathbb{Z})$

hence the moduli space of principally polarized abelian varieties is constructed from the stack quotient

$\mathcal{A}_g = [\operatorname{Sp}_{2g}(\mathbb{Z})\backslash H_g]$

which gives a Deligne-Mumford stack over $\operatorname{Spec}(\mathbb{C})$. If this is instead given by a GIT quotient, then it gives the coarse moduli space $A_g$.

=== Principally polarized Abelian varieties with level n structure ===
In many cases, it is easier to work with principally polarized Abelian varieties equipped with level n-structure because this breaks the symmetries, giving a moduli scheme instead of a moduli stack. In other words, the functor that associates to a test scheme T the set of morphisms X -> T where all geometric fibers are principally polarized abelian varieties with level n-structure (intuitively, a family of objects parameterized by T) is actually representable by a scheme. A level n-structure is given by a fixed basis of

$$H_1(X_\Omega, \mathbb{Z}/n) \cong \frac{1}{n}\cdot L/L \cong n\text{-torsion of } X_\Omega$$

where $L$ is the lattice $\Omega\mathbb{Z}^g + \mathbb{Z}^g \subset \mathbb{C}^{2g}$. An automorphism of an abelian variety with level structure is an automorphism of the variety that fixes this basis, and there are no such automorphisms other than the identity. Since no points have a stabilizer, the moduli space of principally polarized abelian varieties with level n-structure, which is a priori a stack, is actually a scheme. In this situation, where a family over arbitrary T is the same as a morphism from T into some scheme M (better: arises from a universal family through pullback), we say M is a fine moduli space. Denote

$\Gamma(n) = \ker [\operatorname{Sp}_{2g}(\mathbb{Z}) \to \operatorname{Sp}_{2g}(\mathbb{Z}/n)]$

and define

$A_{g,n} = \Gamma(n)\backslash H_g$

as a quotient variety.

== See also ==
- Schottky problem
- Siegel modular variety
- Moduli stack of elliptic curves
- Moduli of algebraic curves
- Hilbert scheme
- Deformation Theory
