= Jacobian variety =

Term in mathematics

In mathematics, the Jacobian variety J(C) of a non-singular algebraic curve C of genus g is the moduli space of degree 0 line bundles. It is the connected component of the identity in the Picard group of C, hence an abelian variety.

== Introduction ==
The Jacobian variety is named after Carl Gustav Jacobi, who proved the complete version of the Abel–Jacobi theorem, making the injectivity statement of Niels Abel into an isomorphism. It is a principally polarized abelian variety, of dimension g, and hence, over the complex numbers, it is a complex torus. If p is a point of C, then the curve C can be mapped to a subvariety of J with the given point p mapping to the identity of J, and C generates J as a group.

== Construction for complex curves ==
Over the complex numbers, the Jacobian variety can be realized as the quotient space V/L, where V is the dual of the vector space of all global holomorphic differentials on C and L is the lattice of all elements of V of the form

$$[\gamma]:\ \omega \mapsto \int_\gamma \omega$$

where γ is a closed path in C. In other words,

$$J(C) = H^0(\Omega_C^1)^* / H_1(C),$$

with $H_1(C)$ embedded in $H^0(\Omega_C^1)^*$ via the above map. This can be done explicitly with the use of theta functions.

The Jacobian of a curve over an arbitrary field was constructed by Weil (1948) as part of his proof of the Riemann hypothesis for curves over a finite field.

The Abel–Jacobi theorem states that the torus thus built is a variety, the classical Jacobian of a curve, that indeed parametrizes the degree 0 line bundles, that is, it can be identified with its Picard variety of degree 0 divisors modulo linear equivalence.

== Algebraic structure ==
As a group, the Jacobian variety of a curve is isomorphic to the quotient of the group of divisors of degree zero by the subgroup of principal divisors, i.e., divisors of rational functions. This holds for fields that are not algebraically closed, provided one considers divisors and functions defined over that field.

== Further notions ==
Torelli's theorem states that a complex curve is determined by its Jacobian (with its polarization).

The Schottky problem asks which principally polarized abelian varieties are the Jacobians of curves.

The Picard variety, the Albanese variety, generalized Jacobian, and intermediate Jacobians are generalizations of the Jacobian for higher-dimensional varieties. For varieties of higher dimension the construction of the Jacobian variety as a quotient of the space of holomorphic 1-forms generalizes to give the Albanese variety, but in general this need not be isomorphic to the Picard variety.

== See also ==
- Period matrix – period matrices are a useful technique for computing the Jacobian of a curve
- Hodge structure – these are generalizations of Jacobians
- Honda–Tate theorem – classifies abelian varieties over finite fields up to isogeny
- Intermediate Jacobian
