= Picard group =

Mathematical group occurring in algebraic geometry and the theory of complex manifolds

In mathematics, the Picard group of a ringed space X, denoted by Pic(X), is the group of isomorphism classes of invertible sheaves (or line bundles) on X, with the group operation being tensor product. This construction is a global version of the construction of the divisor class group, or ideal class group, and is much used in algebraic geometry and the theory of complex manifolds.

Alternatively, the Picard group can be defined as the sheaf cohomology group

$$H^1 (X, \mathcal{O}_X^\ast).\,$$

For integral schemes the Picard group is isomorphic to the class group of Cartier divisors. For complex manifolds the exponential sheaf sequence gives basic information on the Picard group.

The name is in honour of Émile Picard's theories, in particular of divisors on algebraic surfaces.

== Examples ==
- The Picard group of the spectrum of a Dedekind domain is its ideal class group.
- The invertible sheaves on projective space P^{n}(k) for k a field, are the twisting sheaves $\mathcal{O}(m),\,$ so the Picard group of P^{n}(k) is isomorphic to Z.
- The Picard group of the affine line with two origins over k is isomorphic to Z.
- The Picard group of the $n$-dimensional complex affine space $\mathbb{C}^n$ is trivial. To see this, consider the long exact cohomology sequence associated to the exponential sequence:
  $$\dots\to H^1(\mathbb{C}^n,\underline{\mathbb{Z}})\to H^1(\mathbb{C}^n,\mathcal{O}_{\mathbb{C}^n}) \to H^1(\mathbb{C}^n,\mathcal{O}^\ast_{\mathbb{C}^n})\to H^2(\mathbb{C}^n,\underline{\mathbb{Z}})\to\cdots$$

Since $H^k(\mathbb{C}^n,\underline{\mathbb{Z}})\simeq H_{\scriptscriptstyle\rm sing}^k(\mathbb{C}^n;\mathbb{Z})$ we have $H^1(\mathbb{C}^n,\underline{\mathbb{Z}})\simeq H^2(\mathbb{C}^n,\underline{\mathbb{Z}})\simeq 0$ because $\mathbb{C}^n$ is contractible. The sequence above implies therefore implies that the Picard group $H^1(\mathbb{C}^n,\mathcal{O}^\ast_{\mathbb{C}^n})$ is isomorphic to $H^1(\mathbb{C}^n,\mathcal{O}_{\mathbb{C}^n})$, and we can apply the Dolbeault isomorphism to calculate $H^1(\mathbb{C}^n,\mathcal{O}_{\mathbb{C}^n})\simeq H^1(\mathbb{C}^n,\Omega^0_{\mathbb{C}^n})\simeq H^{0,1}_{\bar{\partial}}(\mathbb{C}^n)$, which is trivial by the Dolbeault–Grothendieck lemma.

== Picard scheme ==
The construction of a scheme structure on (the representable functor version of) the Picard group, the Picard scheme, is an important step in algebraic geometry, in particular in the duality theory of abelian varieties. It was constructed by Grothendieck (1962), and also described by Mumford (1966) and Kleiman (2005).

In the cases of most importance to classical algebraic geometry, for a non-singular complete variety V over a field of characteristic zero, the connected component of the identity in the Picard scheme is an abelian variety called the Picard variety and denoted Pic^{0}(V). The dual of the Picard variety is the Albanese variety, and in the particular case where V is a curve, the Picard variety is naturally isomorphic to the Jacobian variety of V. For fields of positive characteristic however, Igusa constructed an example of a smooth projective surface S with Pic^{0}(S) non-reduced, and hence not an abelian variety.

The quotient Pic(V)/Pic^{0}(V) is a finitely-generated abelian group denoted NS(V), the Néron–Severi group of V. In other words, the Picard group fits into an exact sequence

$$1\to \mathrm{Pic}^0(V)\to\mathrm{Pic}(V)\to \mathrm{NS}(V)\to 1.\,$$

The fact that the rank of NS(V) is finite is Francesco Severi's theorem of the base; the rank is the Picard number of V, often denoted ρ(V). Geometrically NS(V) describes the algebraic equivalence classes of divisors on V; that is, using a stronger, non-linear equivalence relation in place of linear equivalence of divisors, the classification becomes amenable to discrete invariants. Algebraic equivalence is closely related to numerical equivalence, an essentially topological classification by intersection numbers.

== Relative Picard scheme ==
Let f: X →S be a morphism of schemes. The relative Picard functor (or relative Picard scheme if it is a scheme) is defined as follows: for any S-scheme T,

$$\operatorname{Pic}_{X/S}(T) = \operatorname{Pic}(X_T)/f_T^*(\operatorname{Pic}(T))$$

where $f_T: X_T \to T$ is the base change of f and f_{T} ^{*} is the pullback.

We say an L in $\operatorname{Pic}_{X/S}(T)$ has degree r if for any geometric point s → T the pullback $s^*L$ of L along s has degree r as an invertible sheaf over the fiber X_{s} (when the degree is defined for the Picard group of X_{s}.)

== See also ==
- Sheaf cohomology
- Chow variety
- Cartier divisor
- Holomorphic line bundle
- Ideal class group
- Arakelov class group
- Group-stack
- Picard category
