= Albanese variety =

Generalisation of Jacobian variety

In mathematics, the Albanese variety $A(V)$, named for Giacomo Albanese, is a generalization of the Jacobian variety of a curve.

== Precise statement ==
The Albanese variety of a smooth projective algebraic variety $V$ is an abelian variety $\operatorname{Alb}(V)$ together with a morphism $V\to \operatorname{Alb}(V)$ such that any morphism from $V$ to an abelian variety factors uniquely through this morphism. For complex manifolds, André Blanchard (1956) defined the Albanese variety in a similar way, as a morphism from $V$ to a complex torus $\operatorname{Alb}(V)$ such that any morphism to a complex torus factors uniquely through this map. (The complex torus $\operatorname{Alb}(V)$ need not be algebraic in this case.)

== Properties ==
For compact Kähler manifolds the dimension of the Albanese variety is the Hodge number $h^{1,0}$, the dimension of the space of differentials of the first kind on $V$, which for surfaces is called the irregularity of a surface. In terms of differential forms, any holomorphic 1-form on $V$ is a pullback of translation-invariant 1-form on the Albanese variety, coming from the holomorphic cotangent space of $\operatorname{Alb}(V)$ at its identity element. Just as for the curve case, by choice of a base point on $V$ (from which to 'integrate'), an Albanese morphism

$$V \to \operatorname{Alb}(V)$$

is defined, along which the 1-forms pull back. This morphism is unique up to a translation on the Albanese variety. For varieties over fields of positive characteristic, the dimension of the Albanese variety may be less than the Hodge numbers $h^{1,0}$ and $h^{0,1}$ (which need not be equal). To see the former note that the Albanese variety is dual to the Picard variety, whose tangent space at the identity is given by $H^1(X, O_X).$ That $\dim \operatorname{Alb}(X) \leq h^{1,0}$ is a result of Jun-ichi Igusa in the bibliography.

== Roitman's theorem ==
If the ground field k is algebraically closed, the Albanese map $V \to \operatorname{Alb}(V)$ can be shown to factor over a group homomorphism (also called the Albanese map)

$$CH_0(V) \to \operatorname{Alb}(V)(k)$$

from the Chow group of 0-dimensional cycles on V to the group of rational points of $\operatorname{Alb}(V)$, which is an abelian group since $\operatorname{Alb}(V)$ is an abelian variety.

Roitman's theorem, introduced by A.A. Rojtman (1980), asserts that, for l prime to char(k), the Albanese map induces an isomorphism on the l-torsion subgroups. The constraint on the primality of the order of torsion to the characteristic of the base field has been removed by Milne shortly thereafter: the torsion subgroup of $\operatorname{CH}_0(X)$ and the torsion subgroup of k-valued points of the Albanese variety of X coincide.

Replacing the Chow group by Suslin–Voevodsky algebraic singular homology after the introduction of Motivic cohomology Roitman's theorem has been obtained and reformulated in the motivic framework. For example, a similar result holds for non-singular quasi-projective varieties. Further versions of Roitman's theorem are available for normal schemes. Actually, the most general formulations of Roitman's theorem (i.e. homological, cohomological, and Borel–Moore) involve the motivic Albanese complex $\operatorname{LAlb} (V)$ and have been proven by Luca Barbieri-Viale and Bruno Kahn (see the references III.13).

== Connection to Picard variety ==
The Albanese variety is dual to the Picard variety (the connected component of zero of the Picard scheme classifying invertible sheaves on V):

$$\operatorname{Alb} V = (\operatorname{Pic}_0 V)^\vee.$$

For algebraic curves, the Abel–Jacobi theorem implies that the Albanese and Picard varieties are isomorphic.

== See also ==
- Intermediate Jacobian
- Albanese scheme
- Motivic Albanese

== Notes & references ==
- Barbieri-Viale, Luca; Kahn, Bruno (2016), On the derived category of 1-motives, Astérisque, vol. 381, SMF, arXiv:1009.1900, ISBN 978-2-85629-818-3, ISSN 0303-1179, MR 3545132
- Blanchard, André (1956), "Sur les variétés analytiques complexes", Annales Scientifiques de l'École Normale Supérieure, Série 3, 73 (2): 157–202, doi:10.24033/asens.1045, ISSN 0012-9593, MR 0087184
- Griffiths, Phillip; Harris, Joe (1994). Principles of Algebraic Geometry. Wiley Classics Library. Wiley Interscience. pp. 331, 552. ISBN 978-0-471-05059-9.
- Igusa, Jun-ichi (1955). "A fundamental inequality in the theory of Picard varieties". Proceedings of the National Academy of Sciences of the United States of America. 41 (5): 317–20. Bibcode:1955PNAS...41..317I. doi:10.1073/pnas.41.5.317. PMC 528086. PMID 16589672.
- Parshin, Aleksei N. (2001) [1994], "Albanese_variety", Encyclopedia of Mathematics, EMS Press
