= Abelian variety =

Projective variety that is also an algebraic group

In mathematics, particularly in algebraic geometry, complex analysis and algebraic number theory, an abelian variety is a smooth projective algebraic variety that is also an algebraic group, i.e., has a group law that can be defined by regular functions. Abelian varieties are at the same time among the most studied objects in algebraic geometry and indispensable tools for research on other topics in algebraic geometry and number theory.

An abelian variety can be defined by equations having coefficients in any field; the variety is then said to be defined over that field. Historically the first abelian varieties to be studied were those defined over the field of complex numbers. Such abelian varieties turn out to be exactly those complex tori that can be holomorphically embedded into a complex projective space.

Abelian varieties defined over algebraic number fields are a special case, which is important also from the viewpoint of number theory. Localization techniques lead naturally from abelian varieties defined over number fields to ones defined over finite fields and various local fields. Since a number field is the fraction field of a Dedekind domain, for any nonzero prime of your Dedekind domain, there is a map from the Dedekind domain to the quotient of the Dedekind domain by the prime, which is a finite field for all finite primes. This induces a map from the fraction field to any such finite field. Given a curve with equation defined over the number field, we can apply this map to the coefficients to get a curve defined over some finite field, where the choices of finite field correspond to the finite primes of the number field.

Abelian varieties appear naturally as Jacobian varieties (the connected components of zero in Picard varieties) and Albanese varieties of other algebraic varieties. The group law of an abelian variety is necessarily commutative and the variety is non-singular. An elliptic curve is an abelian variety of dimension 1. Abelian varieties have Kodaira dimension 0.

== History and motivation ==
In the early nineteenth century, the theory of elliptic functions succeeded in giving a basis for the theory of elliptic integrals, and this left open an obvious avenue of research. The standard forms for elliptic integrals involved the square roots of cubic and quartic polynomials. When those were replaced by polynomials of higher degree, say quintics, what would happen?

In the work of Niels Abel and Carl Jacobi, the answer was formulated: this would involve functions of two complex variables, having four independent periods (i.e. period vectors). This gave the first glimpse of an abelian variety of dimension 2 (an abelian surface): what would now be called the Jacobian of a hyperelliptic curve of genus 2.

After Abel and Jacobi, some of the most important contributors to the theory of abelian functions were Riemann, Weierstrass, Frobenius, Poincaré, and Picard. The subject was very popular at the time, already having a large literature.

By the end of the 19th century, mathematicians had begun to use geometric methods in the study of abelian functions. Eventually, in the 1920s, Lefschetz laid the basis for the study of abelian functions in terms of complex tori. He also appears to be the first to use the name "abelian variety". It was André Weil in the 1940s who gave the subject its modern foundations in the language of algebraic geometry.

Today, abelian varieties form an important tool in number theory, in dynamical systems (more specifically in the study of Hamiltonian systems), and in algebraic geometry (especially Picard varieties and Albanese varieties).

== Analytic theory ==
=== Definition ===
A complex torus of dimension g is a torus of real dimension 2g that carries the structure of a complex manifold. It can always be obtained as the quotient of a g-dimensional complex vector space by a lattice of rank 2g. A complex abelian variety of dimension g is a complex torus of dimension g that is also a projective algebraic variety over the field of complex numbers. By invoking the Kodaira embedding theorem and Chow's theorem, one may equivalently define a complex abelian variety of dimension g to be a complex torus of dimension g that admits a positive line bundle. Since they are complex tori, abelian varieties carry the structure of a group. A morphism of abelian varieties is a morphism of the underlying algebraic varieties that preserves the identity element for the group structure. An isogeny is a finite-to-one morphism.

When a complex torus carries the structure of an algebraic variety, this structure is necessarily unique. In the case $g = 1$, the notion of abelian variety is the same as that of elliptic curve, and every complex torus gives rise to such a curve; for $g > 1$ it has been known since Riemann that the algebraic variety condition imposes extra constraints on a complex torus.

=== Riemann conditions ===
The following criterion by Riemann decides whether or not a given complex torus is an abelian variety, i.e., whether or not it can be holomorphically embedded into a projective space. Let X be a g-dimensional torus given as $X = V/L$ where V is a complex vector space of dimension g and L is a lattice in V. Then X is an abelian variety if and only if there exists a positive definite hermitian form on V whose imaginary part takes integral values on $L \times L$. Such a form on X is usually called a (non-degenerate) Riemann form. Choosing a basis for V and L, one can make this condition more explicit. There are several equivalent formulations of this; all of them are known as the Riemann conditions.

=== The Jacobian of an algebraic curve ===
Every algebraic curve C of genus $g \ge 1$ is associated with an abelian variety J of dimension g, by means of an analytic map of C into J. As a torus, J carries a commutative group structure, and the image of C generates J as a group. More accurately, J is covered by $C^g$: any point in J comes from a g-tuple of points in C. The study of differential forms on C, which give rise to the abelian integrals with which the theory started, can be derived from the simpler, translation-invariant theory of differentials on J. The abelian variety J is called the Jacobian variety of C, for any non-singular curve C over the complex numbers. From the point of view of birational geometry, its function field is the fixed field of the symmetric group on g letters acting on the function field of $C^g$.

=== Abelian functions ===
An abelian function is a meromorphic function on an abelian variety, which may be regarded therefore as a periodic function of n complex variables, having 2n independent periods; equivalently, it is a function in the function field of an abelian variety. For example, in the nineteenth century there was much interest in hyperelliptic integrals that may be expressed in terms of elliptic integrals. This comes down to asking that J is a product of elliptic curves, up to an isogeny.

=== Important theorems ===
One important structure theorem of abelian varieties is Matsusaka's theorem. It states that over an algebraically closed field every abelian variety $A$ is the quotient of the Jacobian of some curve; that is, there is some surjection of abelian varieties $J \to A$ where $J$ is a Jacobian. This theorem remains true if the ground field is infinite.

== Algebraic definition ==
Two equivalent definitions of abelian variety over a general field k are commonly in use:

- a connected and complete algebraic group over k
- a connected and projective algebraic group over k.

When the base is the field $\Complex$ of complex numbers, these notions coincide with the previous definition. Over all bases, elliptic curves are abelian varieties of dimension 1.

In the early 1940s, Weil used the first definition (over an arbitrary base field) but could not at first prove that it implied the second. Only in 1948 did he prove that complete algebraic groups can be embedded into projective space. Meanwhile, in order to make the proof of the Riemann hypothesis for curves over finite fields that he had announced in 1940 work, he had to introduce the notion of an abstract variety and to rewrite the foundations of algebraic geometry to work with varieties without projective embeddings (see also the history section in the Algebraic Geometry article).

== Structure of the group of points ==
By the definitions, an abelian variety is a group variety. Its group of points can be proven to be commutative.

For the field $\Complex$, and hence by the Lefschetz principle for every algebraically closed field of characteristic zero, the torsion group of an abelian variety of dimension g is isomorphic to $(\Q/\Z)^{2g}$. Hence, its n-torsion part is isomorphic to $(\Z/n\Z)^{2g}$, i.e., the product of 2g copies of the cyclic group of order n.

When the base field is an algebraically closed field of characteristic p, the n-torsion is still isomorphic to $(\Z/n\Z)^{2g}$ when n and p are coprime. When n and p are not coprime, the same result can be recovered provided one interprets it as saying that the n-torsion defines a finite flat group scheme of rank 2g. If instead of looking at the full scheme structure on the n-torsion, one considers only the geometric points, one obtains a new invariant for varieties in characteristic p (the so-called p-rank when $n = p$).

The group of k-rational points for a global field k is finitely generated by the Mordell-Weil theorem. Hence, by the structure theorem for finitely generated abelian groups, it is isomorphic to a product of a free abelian group $\Z^r$ and a finite commutative group for some non-negative integer r called the rank of the abelian variety. Similar results hold for some other classes of fields k.

== Products ==
The product of an abelian variety A of dimension m, and an abelian variety B of dimension n, over the same field, is an abelian variety of dimension $m + n$. An abelian variety is simple if it is not isogenous to a product of abelian varieties of lower dimension. Any abelian variety is isogenous to a product of simple abelian varieties.

== Polarisation and dual abelian variety ==
=== Dual abelian variety ===
To an abelian variety A over a field k, one associates a dual abelian variety $A^{\vee}$ (over the same field), which is the solution to the following moduli problem. A family of degree 0 line bundles parametrised by a k-variety T is defined to be a line bundle L on $A \times T$ such that

1. for all t in T, the restriction of L to $A \times \{ t \}$ is a degree 0 line bundle,
2. the restriction of L to $\{ 0 \} \times T$ is a trivial line bundle (here 0 is the identity of A).

Then there is a variety $A^{\vee}$ and a family of degree 0 line bundles P, the Poincaré bundle, parametrised by $A^{\vee}$ such that a family L on T is associated a unique morphism $f\colon T \to A^{\vee}$ so that L is isomorphic to the pullback of P along the morphism $1_A \times f \colon A \times T \to A \times A^{\vee}$. Applying this to the case when T is a point, we see that the points of $A^{\vee}$ correspond to line bundles of degree 0 on A, so there is a natural group operation on $A^{\vee}$ given by tensor product of line bundles, which makes it into an abelian variety.

This association is a duality in the sense that it is contravariant functorial, i.e., it associates to all morphisms $f\colon A\to B$ dual morphisms $f^{\vee}\colon B^{\vee} \to A^{\vee}$ in a compatible way, and there is a natural isomorphism between the double dual $(A^{\vee})^{\vee}$ and $A$ (defined via the Poincaré bundle). The n-torsion of an abelian variety and the n-torsion of its dual are dual to each other when n is coprime to the characteristic of the base. In general — for all n — the n-torsion group schemes of dual abelian varieties are Cartier duals of each other. This generalises the Weil pairing for elliptic curves.

=== Polarisations ===
A polarisation of an abelian variety is an isogeny from an abelian variety to its dual that is symmetric with respect to double-duality for abelian varieties and for which the pullback of the Poincaré bundle along the associated graph morphism is ample (so it is analogous to a positive definite quadratic form). Polarised abelian varieties have finite automorphism groups. A principal polarisation is a polarisation that is an isomorphism. Jacobians of curves are naturally equipped with a principal polarisation as soon as one picks an arbitrary rational base point on the curve, and the curve can be reconstructed from its polarised Jacobian when the genus is $> 1$. Not all principally polarised abelian varieties are Jacobians of curves; see the Schottky problem. A polarisation induces a Rosati involution on the endomorphism ring $\mathrm{End}(A)\otimes\mathbb{Q}$ of A.

=== Polarisations over the complex numbers ===
Over the complex numbers, a polarised abelian variety can be defined as an abelian variety A together with a choice of a Riemann form H. Two Riemann forms $H_1$ and $H_2$ are called equivalent if there are positive integers n and m such that $n H_1 = m H_2$. A choice of an equivalence class of Riemann forms on A is called a polarisation of A; over the complex number this is equivalent to the definition of polarisation given above. A morphism of polarised abelian varieties is a morphism $A \to B$ of abelian varieties such that the pullback of the Riemann form on B to A is equivalent to the given form on A.

== Abelian scheme ==
One can also define abelian varieties scheme-theoretically and relative to a base. This allows for a uniform treatment of phenomena such as reduction mod p of abelian varieties (see Arithmetic of abelian varieties), and parameter-families of abelian varieties. An abelian scheme over a base scheme S of relative dimension g is a proper, smooth group scheme over S whose geometric fibers are connected and of dimension g. The fibers of an abelian scheme are abelian varieties, so one could think of an abelian scheme over S as being a family of abelian varieties parametrised by S.

For an abelian scheme $A/S$, the group of n-torsion points forms a finite flat group scheme. The union of the $p^n$-torsion points, for all n, forms a p-divisible group. Deformations of abelian schemes are, according to the Serre–Tate theorem, governed by the deformation properties of the associated p-divisible groups.

=== Example ===
Let $A,B\in \mathbb{Z}$ be such that $x^3+Ax+B$ has no repeated complex roots. Then the discriminant $\Delta=-16(4A^3+27B^2)$ is nonzero. Let $R=\Z[1/\Delta]$, so $\operatorname{Spec} R$ is an open subscheme of $\operatorname{Spec} \mathbb{Z}$. Then $\operatorname{Proj} R[x,y,z]/(y^2 z - x^3 - A x z^2 - B z^3)$ is an abelian scheme over $\operatorname{Spec} R$. It can be extended to a Néron model over $\operatorname{Spec} \Z$, which is a smooth group scheme over $\operatorname{Spec} \Z$, but the Néron model is not proper and hence is not an abelian scheme over $\operatorname{Spec} \Z$.

=== Non-existence ===
Viktor Abrashkin and Jean-Marc Fontaine independently proved that there are no nonzero abelian varieties over $\Q$ with good reduction at all primes. Equivalently, there are no nonzero abelian schemes over $\operatorname{Spec} \Z$. The proof involves showing that the coordinates of $p^n$-torsion points generate number fields with very little ramification and hence of small discriminant, while, on the other hand, there are lower bounds on discriminants of number fields.

== Semiabelian variety ==
A semiabelian variety is a commutative group variety which is an extension of an abelian variety by a torus.

== See also ==
- Motives
- Timeline of abelian varieties
- Moduli of abelian varieties
- Equations defining abelian varieties
- Horrocks–Mumford bundle

== Sources ==
- Birkenhake, Christina; Lange, H. (1992), Complex Abelian Varieties, Berlin, New York: Springer-Verlag, ISBN 978-0-387-54747-3. A comprehensive treatment of the complex theory, with an overview of the history of the subject.
- Dolgachev, I.V. (2001) [1994], "Abelian scheme", Encyclopedia of Mathematics, EMS Press
- Faltings, Gerd; Chai, Ching-Li (1990), Degeneration of Abelian Varieties, Springer Verlag, ISBN 3-540-52015-5
- Milne, James, Abelian Varieties. Online course notes.
- Mumford, David (2008) [1970], Abelian varieties, Tata Institute of Fundamental Research Studies in Mathematics, vol. 5, Providence, R.I.: American Mathematical Society, ISBN 978-81-85931-86-9, MR 0282985, OCLC 138290
- Venkov, B.B.; Parshin, A.N. (2001) [1994], "Abelian_variety", Encyclopedia of Mathematics, EMS Press
- Bruin, N; Flynn, E.V., N-COVERS OF HYPERELLIPTIC CURVES (PDF), Oxford: Mathematical Institute, University of Oxford. Description of the Jacobian of the Covering Curves
