= Bitangent =

Line tangent to a curve at two locations

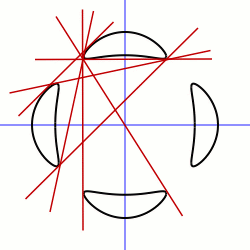
The Trott curve (black) has 28 real bitangents (red). This image shows 7 of them; the others are symmetric with respect to 90° rotations through the origin and reflections through the two blue axes.

In geometry, a bitangent to a curve C is a line L that touches C in two distinct points P and Q and that has the same direction as C at these points. That is, L is a tangent line at P and at Q.

== Bitangents of algebraic curves ==
In general, an algebraic curve will have infinitely many secant lines, but only finitely many bitangents.

Bézout's theorem implies that an algebraic plane curve with a bitangent must have degree at least 4. The case of the 28 bitangents of a quartic was a celebrated piece of geometry of the nineteenth century, a relationship being shown to the 27 lines on the cubic surface.

== Bitangents of polygons ==
The four bitangents of two disjoint convex polygons may be found efficiently by an algorithm based on binary search in which one maintains a binary search pointer into the lists of edges of each polygon and moves one of the pointers left or right at each steps depending on where the tangent lines to the edges at the two pointers cross each other. This bitangent calculation is a key subroutine in data structures for maintaining convex hulls dynamically (Overmars & van Leeuwen 1981). Pocchiola and Vegter (1996a, 1996b) describe an algorithm for efficiently listing all bitangent line segments that do not cross any of the other curves in a system of multiple disjoint convex curves, using a technique based on pseudotriangulation.

Bitangents may be used to speed up the visibility graph approach to solving the Euclidean shortest path problem: the shortest path among a collection of polygonal obstacles may only enter or leave the boundary of an obstacle along one of its bitangents, so the shortest path can be found by applying Dijkstra's algorithm to a subgraph of the visibility graph formed by the visibility edges that lie on bitangent lines (Rohnert 1986).

== Related concepts ==
A bitangent differs from a secant line in that a secant line may cross the curve at the two points it intersects it. One can also consider bitangents that are not lines; for instance, the symmetry set of a curve is the locus of centers of circles that are tangent to the curve in two points.

Bitangents to pairs of circles figure prominently in Jakob Steiner's 1826 construction of the Malfatti circles, in the belt problem of calculating the length of a belt connecting two pulleys, in Casey's theorem characterizing sets of four circles with a common tangent circle, and in Monge's theorem on the collinearity of intersection points of certain bitangents.
