= Abel–Jacobi map =

Construction in algebraic geometry

In mathematics, the Abel–Jacobi map is a construction of algebraic geometry which relates an algebraic curve to its Jacobian variety. In Riemannian geometry, it is a more general construction mapping a manifold to its Jacobi torus. The name derives from the theorem of Abel and Jacobi that two effective divisors are linearly equivalent if and only if they are indistinguishable under the Abel–Jacobi map.

== Construction of the map ==
In complex algebraic geometry, the Jacobian of a curve C is constructed using path integration. Namely, suppose C has genus g, which means topologically that

$$H_1(C, \Z) \cong \Z^{2g}.$$

Geometrically, this homology group consists of (homology classes of) cycles in C, or in other words, closed loops. Therefore, we can choose 2g loops $\gamma_1, \ldots, \gamma_{2g}$ generating it. On the other hand, another more algebro-geometric way of saying that the genus of C is g is that

$$H^0(C, K) \cong \Complex^g,$$

where K is the canonical bundle on C.

By definition, this is the space of globally defined holomorphic differential forms on C, so we can choose g linearly independent forms $\omega_1, \ldots, \omega_g$. Given forms and closed loops we can integrate, and we define 2g vectors

$$\Omega_j = \left(\int_{\gamma_j} \omega_1, \ldots, \int_{\gamma_j} \omega_g\right) \in \Complex^g.$$

It follows from the Riemann bilinear relations that the $\Omega_j$ generate a nondegenerate lattice $\Lambda$ (that is, they are a real basis for $\Complex^g \cong \R^{2g}$), and the Jacobian is defined by

$$J(C) = \Complex^g/\Lambda.$$

The Abel–Jacobi map is then defined as follows. We pick some base point $p_0 \in C$ and, nearly mimicking the definition of $\Lambda,$ define the map

$$\begin{cases} u : C \to J(C) \\ u(p) = \left( \int_{p_0}^p \omega_1, \dots, \int_{p_0}^p \omega_g\right) \bmod \Lambda \end{cases}$$

Although this is seemingly dependent on a path from $p_0$ to $p,$ any two such paths define a closed loop in $C$ and, therefore, an element of $H_1(C, \Z),$ so integration over it gives an element of $\Lambda.$ Thus the difference is erased in the passage to the quotient by $\Lambda$. Changing base-point $p_0$ does change the map, but only by a translation of the torus.

== The Abel–Jacobi map of a Riemannian manifold ==
Let $M$ be a smooth compact manifold. Let $\pi = \pi_1(M)$ be its fundamental group. Let $f: \pi \to \pi^{ab}$ be its abelianisation map. Let $\operatorname{tor}= \operatorname{tor}(\pi^{ab})$ be the torsion subgroup of $\pi^{ab}$. Let $g: \pi^{ab} \to \pi^{ab}/\operatorname{tor}$ be the quotient by torsion. If $M$ is a surface, $\pi^{ab}/\operatorname{tor}$ is non-canonically isomorphic to $\Z^{2g}$, where $g$ is the genus; more generally, $\pi^{ab}/\operatorname{tor}$ is non-canonically isomorphic to $\Z^b$, where $b$ is the first Betti number. Let $\varphi=g \circ f : \pi \to \Z^b$ be the composite homomorphism.

Definition. The cover $\bar M$ of the manifold $M$ corresponding to the subgroup $\ker(\varphi) \subset \pi$ is called the universal (or maximal) free abelian cover.

Now assume $M$ has a Riemannian metric. Let $E$ be the space of harmonic 1-forms on $M$, with dual $E^*$ canonically identified with $H_1(M,\R)$. By integrating an integral harmonic 1-form along paths from a basepoint $x_0\in M$, we obtain a map to the circle $\R/\Z=S^1$.

Similarly, in order to define a map $M\to H_1(M,\R) / H_1(M,\Z)_{\R}$ without choosing a basis for cohomology, we argue as follows. Let $x$ be a point in the universal cover $\tilde{M}$ of $M$. Thus $x$ is represented by a point of $M$ together with a path $c$ from $x_0$ to it. By integrating along the path $c$, we obtain a linear form on $E$:

$$h\to \int_c h.$$

This gives rise a map

$$\tilde{M}\to E^* = H_1(M,\R),$$

which, furthermore, descends to a map

$$\begin{cases} \overline{A}_M: \overline{M}\to E^* \\ c\mapsto \left( h\mapsto \int_c h \right) \end{cases}$$

where $\overline{M}$ is the universal free abelian cover.

Definition. The Jacobi variety (Jacobi torus) of $M$ is the torus

$$J_1(M)=H_1(M,\R)/H_1(M,\Z)_{\R}.$$

Definition. The Abel–Jacobi map

$$A_M: M \to J_1(M),$$

is obtained from the map above by passing to quotients.

The Abel–Jacobi map is unique up to translations of the Jacobi torus. The map has applications in Systolic geometry. The Abel–Jacobi map of a Riemannian manifold shows up in the large time asymptotics of the heat kernel on a periodic manifold (Kotani & Sunada (2000) and Sunada (2012)).

In much the same way, one can define a graph-theoretic analogue of Abel–Jacobi map as a piecewise-linear map from a finite graph into a flat torus (or a Cayley graph associated with a finite abelian group), which is closely related to asymptotic behaviors of random walks on crystal lattices, and can be used for design of crystal structures.

== The Abel–Jacobi map of a compact Riemann surface ==
We provide an analytic construction of the Abel-Jacobi map on compact Riemann surfaces.

Let $M$ denote a compact Riemann surface of genus $g>0$. Let $\{a_1,...,a_g,b_1,...,b_g\}$ be a canonical homology basis on $M$, and $\{\zeta_1,...,\zeta_g\}$ the dual basis for $\mathcal{H}^1(M)$, which is a $g$-dimensional complex vector space consisting of holomorphic differential forms. By a Dual basis we mean $\int_{a_k}\zeta_j = \delta_{jk}$, for $j,k = 1,...,g$. We can form a symmetric matrix whose entries are $\int_{b_k}\zeta_j$, for $j,k=1,...,g$. Let $L$ be the lattice generated by the $2g$-columns of the $g\times 2g$ matrix whose entries consists of $\int_{c_k}\zeta_j$ for $j,k=1,...,g$ where $c_k\in\{a_k,b_k\}$. We call $J(M)=\Bbb C^g/L(M)$ the Jacobian variety of $M$ which is a compact, commutative $g$-dimensional complex Lie group.

We can define a map $\varphi:M\to J(M)$ by choosing a point $P_0\in M$ and setting $\varphi(P) = \left(\int_{P_0}^P\zeta_1,...,\int_{P_0}^P\zeta_g\right).$ which is a well-defined holomorphic mapping with rank 1 (maximal rank). Then we can naturally extend this to a mapping of divisor classes;

If we denote $\mathrm{Div}(M)$ the divisor class group of $M$ then define a map $\varphi:\mathrm{Div}(M)\to J(M)$ by setting $\varphi(D) = \sum_{j=1}^r\varphi(P_j)-\sum_{j=1}^s\varphi(Q_j),\quad D = P_1\cdots P_r/Q_1\cdots Q_s.$

Note that if $r =s$ then this map is independent of the choice of the base point so we can define the base point independent map $\varphi_0:\mathrm{Div}^{(0)}(M)\to J(M)$ where $\mathrm{Div}^{(0)}(M)$ denotes the divisors of degree zero of $M$.

The below Abel's theorem show that the kernel of the map $\varphi_0$ is precisely the subgroup of principal divisors. Together with the Jacobi inversion problem, we can say that $J(M)$ is isomorphic as a group to the group of divisors of degree zero modulo its subgroup of principal divisors.

== Abel–Jacobi theorem ==
The following theorem was proved by Abel (known as Abel's theorem): Suppose that

$$D = \sum\nolimits_i n_i p_i$$

is a divisor (meaning a formal integer-linear combination of points of C). We can define

$$u(D) = \sum\nolimits_i n_i u(p_i)$$

and therefore speak of the value of the Abel–Jacobi map on divisors. The theorem is then that if D and E are two effective divisors, meaning that the $n_i$ are all positive integers, then

$u(D) = u(E)$ if and only if $D$ is linearly equivalent to $E.$ This implies that the Abel-Jacobi map induces an injective map (of abelian groups) from the space of divisor classes of degree zero to the Jacobian.

Jacobi proved that this map is also surjective (known as Jacobi inversion problem), so the two groups are naturally isomorphic.

The Abel–Jacobi theorem implies that the Albanese variety of a compact complex curve (dual of holomorphic 1-forms modulo periods) is isomorphic to its Jacobian variety (divisors of degree 0 modulo equivalence). For higher-dimensional compact projective varieties the Albanese variety and the Picard variety are dual but need not be isomorphic.
