= Johann Georg Rosenhain =

German mathematician

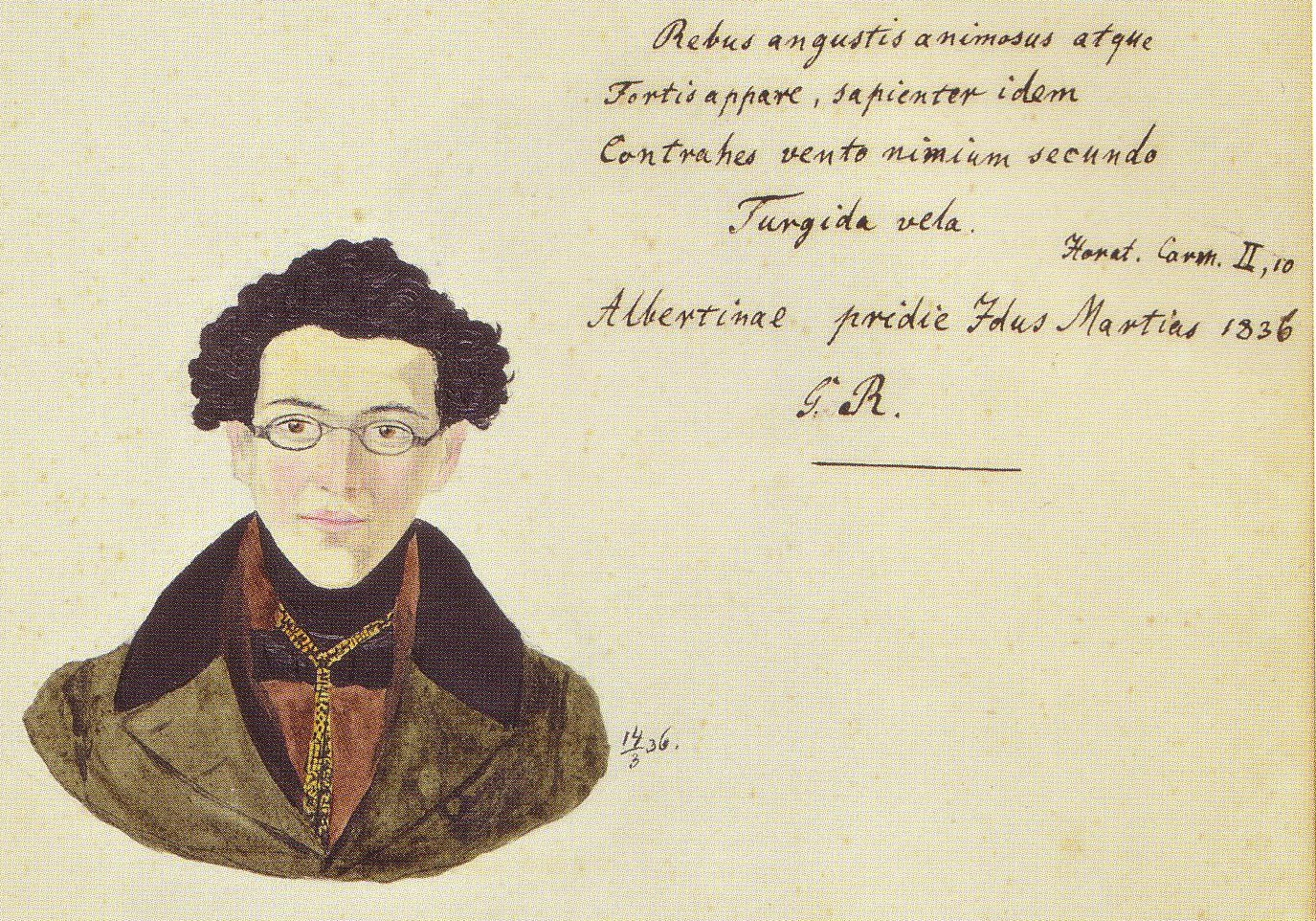

Johann Georg Rosenhain (10 June 1816 in Königsberg – 14 March 1887 Berlin) was a German mathematician who introduced theta characteristics.

Rosenhain was born to a Jewish family, to Nathan Rosenhain and Röschen Joseph.
