= Exponential sheaf sequence =

In mathematics, the exponential sheaf sequence is a fundamental short exact sequence of sheaves used in complex geometry.

Let M be a complex manifold, and write O_{M} for the sheaf of holomorphic functions on M. Let O_{M}* be the subsheaf consisting of the non-vanishing holomorphic functions. These are both sheaves of abelian groups. The exponential function gives a sheaf homomorphism

$$\exp : \mathcal O_M \to \mathcal O_M^*,$$

because for a holomorphic function f, exp(f) is a non-vanishing holomorphic function, and exp(f + g) = exp(f)exp(g). Its kernel is the sheaf 2πiZ of locally constant functions on M taking the values 2πin, with n an integer. The exponential sheaf sequence is therefore

$$0\to 2\pi i\,\mathbb Z \to \mathcal O_M\to\mathcal O_M^*\to 0.$$

The exponential mapping here is not always a surjective map on sections; this can be seen for example when M is a punctured disk in the complex plane. The exponential map is surjective on the stalks: Given a germ g of an holomorphic function at a point P such that g(P) ≠ 0, one can take the logarithm of g in a neighborhood of P. The long exact sequence of sheaf cohomology shows that we have an exact sequence

$$\cdots\to H^0(\mathcal O_U) \to H^0(\mathcal O_U^*)\to H^1(2\pi i\,\mathbb Z|_U) \to \cdots$$

for any open set U of M. Here H^{0} means simply the sections over U, and the sheaf cohomology H^{1}(2πiZ|_{U}) is the singular cohomology of U.

One can think of H^{1}(2πiZ|_{U}) as associating an integer to each loop in U. For each section of O_{M}*, the connecting homomorphism to H^{1}(2πiZ|_{U}) gives the winding number for each loop. So this homomorphism is therefore a generalized winding number and measures the failure of U to be contractible. In other words, there is a potential topological obstruction to taking a global logarithm of a non-vanishing holomorphic function, something that is always locally possible.

A further consequence of the sequence is the exactness of

$$\cdots\to H^1(\mathcal O_M)\to H^1(\mathcal O_M^*)\to H^2(2\pi i\,\mathbb Z)\to \cdots.$$

Here H^{1}(O_{M}*) can be identified with the Picard group of holomorphic line bundles on M. The connecting homomorphism sends a line bundle to its first Chern class.
