= Riemann form =

In mathematics, a Riemann form in the theory of abelian varieties and modular forms, is the following data:

- A lattice Λ in a complex vector space C^{g}.
- An alternating bilinear form α from Λ to the integers satisfying the following Riemann bilinear relations:
1. the real linear extension α_{R}:C^{g} × C^{g}→R of α satisfies α_{R}(iv, iw)=α_{R}(v, w) for all (v, w) in C^{g} × C^{g};
2. the associated hermitian form H(v, w)=α_{R}(iv, w) + iα_{R}(v, w) is positive-definite.

(The hermitian form written here is linear in the first variable.)

Riemann forms are important because of the following:

- The alternatization of the Chern class of any factor of automorphy is a Riemann form.
- Conversely, given any Riemann form, we can construct a factor of automorphy such that the alternatization of its Chern class is the given Riemann form.

Furthermore, the complex torus C^{g}/Λ admits the structure of an abelian variety if and only if there exists an alternating bilinear form α such that (Λ,α) is a Riemann form.
