= Line bundle =

Vector bundle of rank 1

In mathematics, a line bundle expresses the concept of a line that varies from point to point of a space. For example, a curve in the plane having a tangent line at each point determines a varying line: the tangent bundle is a way of organising these. More formally, in algebraic topology and differential topology, a line bundle is defined as a vector bundle of rank 1.

Line bundles are specified by choosing a one-dimensional vector space for each point of the space in a continuous manner. In topological applications, this vector space is usually real or complex. The two cases display fundamentally different behavior because of the different topological properties of real and complex vector spaces: If the origin is removed from the real line, then the result is the set of 1×1 invertible real matrices, which is homotopy-equivalent to a discrete two-point space by contracting the positive and negative reals each to a point; whereas removing the origin from the complex plane yields the 1×1 invertible complex matrices, which have the homotopy type of a circle.

From the perspective of homotopy theory, a real line bundle therefore behaves much the same as a fiber bundle with a two-point fiber, that is, like a double cover. A special case of this is the orientable double cover of a differentiable manifold, where the corresponding line bundle is the determinant bundle of the tangent bundle (see below). The Möbius strip corresponds to a double cover of the circle (the θ → 2θ mapping) and by changing the fiber, can also be viewed as having a two-point fiber, the unit interval as a fiber, or the real line.

Complex line bundles are closely related to circle bundles. There are some celebrated ones, for example the Hopf fibrations of spheres to spheres.

In algebraic geometry, an invertible sheaf (i.e., locally free sheaf of rank one) is often called a line bundle.

Every line bundle arises from a divisor under the following conditions:

(I) If $X$ is a reduced and irreducible scheme, then every line bundle comes from a divisor.
(II) If $X$ is a projective scheme then the same statement holds.

== The tautological bundle on projective space ==
One of the most important line bundles in algebraic geometry is the tautological line bundle on projective space. The projectivization $\mathbf{P}(V)$ of a vector space $V$ over a field $k$ is defined to be the quotient of $V \setminus \{0\}$ by the action of the multiplicative group $k^{\times}$. Each point of $\mathbf{P}(V)$ therefore corresponds to a copy of $k^{\times}$, and these copies of $k^{\times}$ can be assembled into a $k^{\times}$-bundle over $\mathbf{P}(V)$. But $k^{\times}$ differs from $k$ only by a single point, and by adjoining that point to each fiber, we get a line bundle on $\mathbf{P}(V)$. This line bundle is called the tautological line bundle. This line bundle is sometimes denoted $\mathcal{O}(-1)$ since it corresponds to the dual of the Serre twisting sheaf $\mathcal{O}(1)$.

=== Maps to projective space ===
Suppose that $X$ is a space and that $L$ is a line bundle on $X$. A global section of $L$ is a function $s:X\to L$ such that if $p:L\to X$ is the natural projection, then $p\circ s=\operatorname{id}_X$. In a small neighborhood $U$ in $X$ in which $L$ is trivial, the total space of the line bundle is the product of $U$ and the underlying field $k$, and the section $s$ restricts to a function $U\to k$. However, the values of $s$ depend on the choice of trivialization, and so they are determined only up to multiplication by a nowhere-vanishing function.

Global sections determine maps to projective spaces in the following way: Choosing $r+1$ not all zero points in a fiber of $L$ chooses a fiber of the tautological line bundle on $\mathbf{P}^r$, so choosing $r+1$ non-simultaneously vanishing global sections of $L$ determines a map from $X$ into projective space $\mathbf{P}^r$. This map sends the fibers of $L$ to the fibers of the dual of the tautological bundle. More specifically, suppose that $s_0,\dots,s_r$ are global sections of $L$. In a small neighborhood $U$ in $X$, these sections determine $k$-valued functions on $U$ whose values depend on the choice of trivialization. However, they are determined up to simultaneous multiplication by a non-zero function, so their ratios are well-defined. That is, over a point $x$, the values $s_0(x),\dots , s_r(x)$ are not well-defined because a change in trivialization will multiply them each by a non-zero constant λ. But it will multiply them by the same constant λ, so the homogeneous coordinates $[s_0(x): \dots :s_r(x)]$ are well-defined as long as the sections $s_0,\dots ,s_r$ do not simultaneously vanish at $x$. Therefore, if the sections never simultaneously vanish, they determine a form $[s_0: \dots : s_r]$ which gives a map from $X$ to $\mathbf{P}^r$, and the pullback of the dual of the tautological bundle under this map is $L$. In this way, projective space acquires a universal property.

The universal way to determine a map to projective space is to map to the projectivization of the vector space of all sections of $L$. In the topological case, there is a non-vanishing section at every point which can be constructed using a bump function which vanishes outside a small neighborhood of the point. Because of this, the resulting map is defined everywhere. However, the codomain is usually far, far too big to be useful. The opposite is true in the algebraic and holomorphic settings. Here the space of global sections is often finite dimensional, but there may not be any non-vanishing global sections at a given point. (As in the case when this procedure constructs a Lefschetz pencil.) In fact, it is possible for a bundle to have no non-zero global sections at all; this is the case for the tautological line bundle. When the line bundle is sufficiently ample this construction verifies the Kodaira embedding theorem.

== Determinant bundles ==
In general if $V$ is a vector bundle on a space $X$, with constant fibre dimension $n$, the $n$-th exterior power of $V$ taken fibre-by-fibre is a line bundle, called the determinant line bundle of $V$. This construction is in particular applied to the cotangent bundle of a smooth manifold. The resulting determinant bundle (more precisely, the bundle of a fixed nonegative power of the absolute values of its sections) is responsible for the phenomenon of tensor densities, in the sense that for an orientable manifold it has a nonvanishing global section, and its tensor powers with any real exponent may be defined and used to 'twist' any vector bundle by tensor product.

The same construction (taking the top exterior power) applies to a finitely generated projective module $M$ over a Noetherian domain and the resulting invertible module is called the determinant module of $M$.

== Characteristic classes, universal bundles and classifying spaces ==
The first Stiefel–Whitney class classifies smooth real line bundles; in particular, the collection of (equivalence classes of) real line bundles are in correspondence with elements of the first cohomology with $\mathbb{Z}/2\mathbb{Z}$ coefficients; this correspondence is in fact an isomorphism of abelian groups (the group operations being tensor product of line bundles and the usual addition on cohomology). Analogously, the first Chern class classifies smooth complex line bundles on a space, and the group of line bundles is isomorphic to the second cohomology class with integer coefficients. However, bundles can have equivalent smooth structures (and thus the same first Chern class) but different holomorphic structures. The Chern class statements are easily proven using the exponential sequence of sheaves on the manifold.

One can more generally view the classification problem from a homotopy-theoretic point of view. There is a universal bundle for real line bundles, and a universal bundle for complex line bundles. According to general theory about classifying spaces, the heuristic is to look for contractible spaces on which there are group actions of the respective groups $C_2$ and $S^1$, that are free actions. Those spaces can serve as the universal principal bundles, and the quotients for the actions as the classifying spaces $BG$. In these cases we can find those explicitly, in the infinite-dimensional analogues of real and complex projective space.

Therefore the classifying space $BC_2$ is of the homotopy type of $\mathbb{R}\mathbf{P}^{\infty}$, the real projective space given by an infinite sequence of homogeneous coordinates. It carries the universal real line bundle; in terms of homotopy theory that means that any real line bundle $L$ on a CW complex $X$ determines a classifying map from $X$ to $\mathbb{R}\mathbf{P}^{\infty}$, making $L$ a bundle isomorphic to the pullback of the universal bundle. This classifying map can be used to define the Stiefel-Whitney class of $L$, in the first cohomology of $X$ with $\mathbb{Z}/2\mathbb{Z}$ coefficients, from a standard class on $\mathbb{R}\mathbf{P}^{\infty}$.

In an analogous way, the complex projective space $\mathbb{C}\mathbf{P}^{\infty}$ carries a universal complex line bundle. In this case classifying maps give rise to the first Chern class of $X$, in $H^2(X)$ (integral cohomology).

There is a further, analogous theory with quaternionic (real dimension four) line bundles. This gives rise to one of the Pontryagin classes, in real four-dimensional cohomology.

In this way foundational cases for the theory of characteristic classes depend only on line bundles. According to a general splitting principle this can determine the rest of the theory (if not explicitly).

There are theories of holomorphic line bundles on complex manifolds, and invertible sheaves in algebraic geometry, that work out a line bundle theory in those areas.

== See also ==
- I-bundle
- Ample line bundle
- Line field
