= Theta function (disambiguation) =

Theta functions $\vartheta(z;\tau)$ are special functions of several complex variables. Theta function may also refer to:

== Jacobi-related functions ==
- q-theta function, $\theta(z;q)$, a type of q-series
- Theta function of a lattice, $\Theta_\Lambda(\tau)$, a holomorphic function on the upper half-plane
- Mock theta functions, $\mu(q), f(q), \phi(q), \psi(q), \chi(q)$, etc., a mock modular form of weight 1/2
- Ramanujan theta function, $f(a,b)$
- Neville theta functions

== Other functions ==
- Riemann–Siegel theta function, $\theta(t)$
- The first Chebyshev function $\vartheta(x)$, the sum of the logarithm of all primes $\leq x$
- Feferman's function, $\theta_\alpha(\beta)$
- Heaviside step function, sometimes denoted $\theta(x)$
- Lovász theta function, an upper bound on the Shannon capacity of a graph

== See also ==
- Jacobi theta functions (notational variations), $\vartheta_{ij}(z;\tau), \vartheta_j(z), \theta_i(z;q)$
