= Signature defect =

In mathematics, the signature defect of a singularity measures the correction that a singularity contributes to the signature theorem. Hirzebruch (1973) introduced the signature defect for the cusp singularities of Hilbert modular surfaces. Michael Francis Atiyah, H. Donnelly, and I. M. Singer (1983) defined the signature defect of the boundary of a manifold as the eta invariant, the value as s = 0 of their eta function, and used this to show that Hirzebruch's signature defect of a cusp of a Hilbert modular surface can be expressed in terms of the value at s = 0 or 1 of a Shimizu L-function.
