= Schottky form =

In mathematics, the Schottky form or Schottky's invariant is a Siegel cusp form J of degree 4 and weight 8, introduced by Friedrich Schottky (1888, 1903) as a degree 16 polynomial in the Thetanullwerte of genus 4. He showed that it vanished at all Jacobian points (the points of the degree 4 Siegel upper half-space corresponding to 4-dimensional abelian varieties that are the Jacobian varieties of genus 4 curves). Igusa (1981) showed that it is a multiple of the difference θ_{4}(E_{8} ⊕ E_{8}) − θ_{4}(E_{16}) of the two genus 4 theta functions of the two 16-dimensional even unimodular lattices and that its divisor of zeros is irreducible. Poor & Yuen (1996) showed that it generates the 1-dimensional space of level 1 genus 4 weight 8 Siegel cusp forms. Ikeda showed that the Schottky form is the image of the Dedekind Delta function under the Ikeda lift.
