= Base change lifting =

In mathematics, base change lifting is a method of constructing new automorphic forms from old ones, that corresponds in Langlands philosophy to the operation of restricting a representation of a Galois group to a subgroup.

The Doi–Naganuma lifting from 1967 was a precursor of the base change lifting. Base change lifting was introduced by Hiroshi Saito (1975, 1975b, 1979) for Hilbert modular forms of cyclic totally real fields of prime degree, by comparing the trace of twisted Hecke operators on Hilbert modular forms with the trace of Hecke operators on ordinary modular forms. Shintani (1979) gave a representation theoretic interpretation of Saito's results and used this to generalize them. Langlands (1980) extended the base change lifting to more general automorphic forms and showed how to use the base change lifting for GL_{2} to prove the Artin conjecture for tetrahedral and some octahedral 2-dimensional representations of the Galois group.

Gelbart (1977), Gérardin (1979) and Gérardin & Labesse (1979) gave expositions of the base change lifting for GL_{2} and its applications to the Artin conjecture.

== Properties ==
If E/F is a finite cyclic Galois extension of global fields, then the base change lifting of Arthur & Clozel (1989) gives a map from automorphic forms for GL_{n}(F) to automorphic forms for GL_{n}(E) = Res_{E/F}GL_{n}(F). This base change lifting is the special case of Langlands functoriality, corresponding (roughly) to the diagonal embedding of the Langlands dual GL_{n}(C) of GL_{n} to the Langlands dual GL_{n}(C)×...×GL_{n}(C) of Res_{E/F}GL_{n}.
