= Miyawaki lift =

The Miyawaki lift or Ikeda–Miyawaki lift or Miyawaki–Ikeda lift, is a mathematical lift that takes two Siegel modular forms to another Siegel modular form. Miyawaki conjectured the existence of this lift for the case of degree 3 Siegel modular forms, and Ikeda proved its existence in some cases using the Ikeda lift.

Ikeda's construction starts with a Siegel modular form of degree 1 and weight 2k, and a Siegel cusp form of degree r and weight k + n + r and constructs a Siegel form of degree 2n + r and weight k + n + r. The case when n = r = 1 was conjectured by Miyawaki. Here n, k, and r are non-negative integers whose sum is even.
