= Q-theta function =

In mathematics, the q-theta function (or modified Jacobi theta function) is a type of q-series which is used to define elliptic hypergeometric series. It is given by

$$\theta(z;q):=\prod_{n=0}^\infty (1-q^nz)\left(1-q^{n+1}/z\right)$$

where one takes 0 ≤ |q| < 1. It obeys the identities

$$\theta(z;q)=\theta\left(\frac{q}{z};q\right)=-z\theta\left(\frac{1}{z};q\right).$$

It may also be expressed as:

$$\theta(z;q)=(z;q)_\infty (q/z;q)_\infty$$

where $(\cdot \cdot )_\infty$ is the q-Pochhammer symbol.

== See also ==
- elliptic hypergeometric series
- Jacobi theta function
- Ramanujan theta function
