= Shimizu L-function =

In mathematics, the Shimizu L-function, introduced by Hideo Shimizu in 1963, is a Dirichlet series associated to a totally real algebraic number field. Michael Francis Atiyah, H. Donnelly, and I. M. Singer (1983) defined the signature defect of the boundary of a manifold as the eta invariant, the value as s=0 of their eta function, and used this to show that Hirzebruch's signature defect of a cusp of a Hilbert modular surface can be expressed in terms of the value at s=0 or 1 of a Shimizu L-function.

== Definition ==
Suppose that K is a totally real algebraic number field, M is a lattice in the field, and V is a subgroup of maximal rank of the group of totally positive units preserving the lattice. The Shimizu L-series is given by

$$L(M,V,s) = \sum_{\mu\in \{M-0\}/V} \frac{\operatorname{sign} N(\mu)}{|N(\mu)|^s}$$
