= Doi–Naganuma lifting =

Mathematical map for transforming elliptic modular forms

In mathematics, the Doi–Naganuma lifting is a map from elliptic modular forms to Hilbert modular forms of a real quadratic field, introduced by Doi & Naganuma (1969) and Naganuma (1973). It was a precursor of the base change lifting.

It is named for Japanese mathematicians Kōji Doi (土井公二) and Hidehisa Naganuma (長沼英久).

== See also ==
- Saito–Kurokawa lift, a similar lift to Siegel modular forms
