= Eta invariant =

Differential operator

In mathematics, the eta invariant of a self-adjoint elliptic differential operator on a compact manifold is formally the number of positive eigenvalues minus the number of negative eigenvalues. In practice both numbers are often infinite so are defined using zeta function regularization. It was introduced by Atiyah, Patodi, and Singer (1973, 1975) who used it to extend the Hirzebruch signature theorem to manifolds with boundary. The name comes from the fact that it is a generalization of the Dirichlet eta function.

They also later used the eta invariant of a self-adjoint operator to define the eta invariant of a compact odd-dimensional smooth manifold.

Michael Francis Atiyah, H. Donnelly, and I. M. Singer (1983) defined the signature defect of the boundary of a manifold as the eta invariant, and used this to show that Hirzebruch's signature defect of a cusp of a Hilbert modular surface can be expressed in terms of the value at s=0 or 1 of a Shimizu L-function.

== Definition ==
The eta invariant of self-adjoint operator A is given by η_{A}(0), where η is the analytic continuation of

$$\eta(s)=\sum_{\lambda\ne 0} \frac{\operatorname{sign}(\lambda)}{|\lambda|^s}$$

and the sum is over the nonzero eigenvalues λ of A.
