= Formally smooth map =

In algebraic geometry and commutative algebra, a ring homomorphism $f:A\to B$ is called formally smooth (from French: Formellement lisse) if it satisfies the following infinitesimal lifting property:

Suppose B is given the structure of an A-algebra via the map f. Given a commutative A-algebra, C, and a nilpotent ideal $N\subseteq C$, any A-algebra homomorphism $B\to C/N$ may be lifted to an A-algebra map $B \to C$. If moreover any such lifting is unique, then f is said to be formally étale.

Formally smooth maps were defined by Alexander Grothendieck in Éléments de géométrie algébrique IV.

For finitely presented morphisms, formal smoothness is equivalent to usual notion of smoothness.

== Examples ==
=== Smooth morphisms ===
All smooth morphisms $f:X\to S$ are equivalent to morphisms locally of finite presentation which are formally smooth. Hence formal smoothness is a slight generalization of smooth morphisms.

=== Non-example ===
One method for detecting formal smoothness of a scheme is using infinitesimal lifting criterion. For example, using the truncation morphism $k[\varepsilon]/(\varepsilon^3) \to k[\varepsilon]/(\varepsilon^2)$ the infinitesimal lifting criterion can be described using the commutative square

$$\begin{matrix}
X & \leftarrow & \text{Spec}\left(\frac{k[\varepsilon]}{(\varepsilon^2)}\right) \\
\downarrow & & \downarrow \\
S & \leftarrow & \text{Spec}\left(\frac{k[\varepsilon]}{(\varepsilon^3)}\right)
\end{matrix}$$

where $X,S \in Sch/S$. For example, if

$X = \text{Spec}\left( \frac{k[x,y]}{(xy)} \right)$ and $Y = \text{Spec}(k)$

then consider the tangent vector at the origin $(0,0) \in X(k)$ given by the ring morphism

$\frac{k[x,y]}{(xy)} \to \frac{k[\varepsilon]}{(\varepsilon^2)}$

sending

$$\begin{align}
x &\mapsto \varepsilon \\
y &\mapsto \varepsilon
\end{align}$$

Note because $xy \mapsto \varepsilon^2 = 0$, this is a valid morphism of commutative rings. Then, since a lifting of this morphism to

$\text{Spec}\left(\frac{k[\varepsilon]}{(\varepsilon^3)}\right) \to X$

is of the form

$$\begin{align}
x &\mapsto \varepsilon + a\varepsilon^2 \\
y &\mapsto \varepsilon + b\varepsilon^2
\end{align}$$

and $xy \mapsto \varepsilon^2 + (a+b)\varepsilon^3= \varepsilon^2$, there cannot be an infinitesimal lift since this is non-zero, hence $X \in Sch/k$ is not formally smooth. This also proves this morphism is not smooth from the equivalence between formally smooth morphisms locally of finite presentation and smooth morphisms.

== See also ==
- Dual number
- Smooth morphism
- Deformation theory
