= Siegel theta series =

In mathematics, a Siegel theta series is a Siegel modular form associated to a positive definite lattice, generalizing the 1-variable theta function of a lattice.

== Definition ==
Suppose that L is a positive definite lattice. The Siegel theta series of degree g is defined by

$$\Theta_L^g(T) = \sum_{\lambda\in L^g}\exp(\pi i Tr(\lambda T \lambda^t))$$

where T is an element of the Siegel upper half plane of degree g.

This is a Siegel modular form of degree d and weight dim(L)/2 for some subgroup of the Siegel modular group. If the lattice L is even and unimodular then this is a Siegel modular form for the full Siegel modular group.

When the degree is 1 this is just the usual theta function of a lattice.
