= Hiroshi Saito (mathematician) =

Japanese mathematician

Hiroshi Saito (齋藤 裕, Saitō Hiroshi; 6th April, 1947-2nd July, 2010) was a Japanese mathematician at the Division of Mathematics and Mathematical Sciences, Graduate School of Science, Kyoto University who worked on automorphic forms. He introduced the base change lifting and the Saito–Kurokawa lift.
