= Jacobi group =

In mathematics, the Jacobi group, introduced by Eichler & Zagier (1985), is the semidirect product of the symplectic group Sp_{2n}(R) and the Heisenberg group R^{1+2n}. The concept is named after Carl Gustav Jacob Jacobi. Automorphic forms in the Jacobi group are called Jacobi forms.
