= Shin-ya Koyama =

Japanese mathematician

Shinya Koyama
- Born: 1962 (age 63–64); Niigata, Niigata, Japan
- Education: Keio University (Ph.D., 1994)
- Scientific career
- Fields: Mathematics
- Workplaces: Toyo University
- Doctoral advisor: Nobushige Kurokawa; Peter Sarnak

Shin-ya Koyama (小山 信也, Koyama Shin'ya; born 1962, Niigata) is a Japanese mathematician working in number theory. He is currently a professor at Toyo University.
