= Nobushige Kurokawa =

Japanese mathematician

- Born: 1952 (age 73–74); Tochigi Prefecture, Japan
- Education: Tokyo Institute of Technology (Ph.D., 1982)
- Known for: Generalized Ramanujan conjecture Saito-Kurokawa conjecture Absolute mathematics
- Scientific career
- Fields: Mathematics
- Workplaces: Tokyo Institute of Technology

Nobushige Kurokawa (黒川 信重, Kurokawa Nobushige; born 1952) is a Japanese mathematician working in number theory, especially analytic number theory, multiple trigonometric function theory, zeta functions and automorphic forms. He is currently a professor emeritus at Tokyo Institute of Technology.

== Books ==
- with Shin-ya Koyama, 多重三角関数論講義 (Lectures on multiple sine functions), 2010. Lectures notes originally from April–July 1991 at University of Tokyo.
- with Shinya Koyama, Absolute Mathematics, 2010. (Japanese)
- Pursuit of the Riemann Hypothesis: ABC to Z, 2012. (Japanese)
- Beyond the Riemann Hypothesis: Deep Riemann Hypothesis (DRH), 2013. (Japanese)
- Modern trigonometric function theory, 2013. (Japanese)
- Principles of Absolute Mathematics, 2016. (Japanese)
- The World of Absolute Mathematics: Riemann Hypothesis, Langlands conjecture, Sato conjecture, 2017. (Japanese)
- with Shinya Koyama, Introduction to the ABC conjecture, 2018. (Japanese)
