= Saito–Kurokawa lift =

In mathematics, the Saito–Kurokawa lift (or lifting) takes elliptic modular forms to Siegel modular forms of degree 2. The existence of this lifting was conjectured in 1977 independently by Hiroshi Saito and Nobushige Kurokawa (1978). Its existence was almost proved by Maass (1979a, 1979b, 1979c), and Andrianov (1979) and Zagier (1981) completed the proof.

== Statement ==
The Saito–Kurokawa lift σ_{k} takes level 1 modular forms f of weight 2k − 2 to level 1 Siegel modular forms of degree 2 and weight k. The L-functions (when f is a Hecke eigenforms) are related by L(s,σ_{k}(f)) = ζ(s − k + 2)ζ(s − k + 1)L(s, f).

The Saito–Kurokawa lift can be constructed as the composition of the following three mappings:

1. The Shimura correspondence from level 1 modular forms of weight 2k − 2 to a space of level 4 modular forms of weight k − 1/2 in the Kohnen plus-space.
2. A map from the Kohnen plus-space to the space of Jacobi forms of index 1 and weight k, studied by Eichler and Zagier.
3. A map from the space of Jacobi forms of index 1 and weight k to the Siegel modular forms of degree 2, introduced by Maass.

The Saito–Kurokawa lift can be generalized to forms of higher level.

The image is the Spezialschar (special band), the space of Siegel modular forms whose Fourier coefficients satisfy

$$a
\begin{pmatrix}
n & t/2 \\
t/2 & m
\end{pmatrix}
=\sum_{d\mid t,m,n} d^{k-1}a
\begin{pmatrix}
1 & t/2d \\
t/2d & nm/d^2
\end{pmatrix}.$$

== See also ==
- Doi–Naganuma lifting, a similar lift to Hilbert modular forms.
- Ikeda lift, a generalization to Siegel modular forms of higher degree.
