= Jacobi triple product =

Mathematical identity found by Jacobi in 1829

In mathematics, the Jacobi triple product is the identity:

$$\prod_{m=1}^\infty
\left( 1 - x^{2m}\right)
\left( 1 + x^{2m-1} y^2\right)
\left( 1 +\frac{x^{2m-1}}{y^2}\right)
= \sum_{n=-\infty}^\infty x^{n^2} y^{2n},$$

for complex numbers x and y, with |x| < 1 and y ≠ 0. It was introduced by Jacobi (1829) in his work Fundamenta Nova Theoriae Functionum Ellipticarum.

The Jacobi triple product identity is the Macdonald identity for the affine root system of type A_{1}, and is the Weyl denominator formula for the corresponding affine Kac–Moody algebra.

== Properties ==
Jacobi's proof relies on Euler's pentagonal number theorem, which is itself a specific case of the Jacobi triple product identity.

Let $x=q\sqrt q$ and $y^2=-\sqrt{q}$. Then we have

$$\phi(q) = \prod_{m=1}^\infty \left(1-q^m \right) =
\sum_{n=-\infty}^\infty (-1)^n q^{\frac{3n^2-n}{2}}.$$

The Rogers–Ramanujan identities follow with $x=q^2\sqrt q$, $y^2=-\sqrt{q}$ and $x=q^2\sqrt q$, $y^2=-q\sqrt{q}$.

The Jacobi Triple Product also allows the Jacobi theta function to be written as an infinite product as follows:

Let $x=e^{i\pi \tau}$ and $y=e^{i\pi z}.$

Then the Jacobi theta function

$$\vartheta(z; \tau) = \sum_{n=-\infty}^\infty e^{\pi {\rm{i}} n^2 \tau + 2 \pi {\rm{i}} n z}$$

can be written in the form

$$\sum_{n=-\infty}^\infty y^{2n}x^{n^2}.$$

Using the Jacobi triple product identity, the theta function can be written as the product

$$\vartheta(z; \tau) = \prod_{m=1}^\infty
\left( 1 - e^{2m \pi {\rm{i}} \tau}\right)
\left[ 1 + e^{(2m-1) \pi {\rm{i}} \tau + 2 \pi {\rm{i}} z}\right]
\left[ 1 + e^{(2m-1) \pi {\rm{i}} \tau -2 \pi {\rm{i}} z}\right].$$

There are many different notations used to express the Jacobi triple product. It takes on a concise form when expressed in terms of q-Pochhammer symbols:

$$\sum_{n=-\infty}^\infty q^{\frac{n(n+1)}{2}}z^n =
(q;q)_\infty \; \left(-\tfrac{1}{z};q\right)_\infty \; (-zq;q)_\infty,$$

where $(a;q)_\infty$ is the infinite q-Pochhammer symbol.

It enjoys a particularly elegant form when expressed in terms of the Ramanujan theta function. For $|ab|<1$ it can be written as

$$\sum_{n=-\infty}^\infty a^{\frac{n(n+1)}{2}} \; b^{\frac{n(n-1)}{2}} = (-a; ab)_\infty \;(-b; ab)_\infty \;(ab;ab)_\infty.$$

== Proof ==
Let $f_x(y) = \prod_{m=1}^\infty \left( 1 - x^{2m} \right)\left( 1 + x^{2m-1} y^2\right)\left( 1 +x^{2m-1}y^{-2}\right)$

Substituting xy for y and multiplying the new terms out gives

$$f_x(xy) = \frac{1+x^{-1}y^{-2}}{1+xy^2}f_x(y) = x^{-1}y^{-2}f_x(y)$$

Since $f_x$ is meromorphic for $|y| > 0$, it has a Laurent series

$$f_x(y)=\sum_{n=-\infty}^\infty c_n(x)y^{2n}$$

which satisfies

$$\sum_{n=-\infty}^\infty c_n(x)x^{2n+1} y^{2n}=x f_x(x y)=y^{-2}f_x(y)=\sum_{n=-\infty}^\infty c_{n+1}(x)y^{2n}$$

so that

$$c_{n+1}(x) = c_n(x)x^{2n+1} = \dots = c_0(x) x^{(n+1)^2}$$

and hence

$$f_x(y)=c_0(x) \sum_{n=-\infty}^\infty x^{n^2} y^{2n}$$

=== Evaluating c_{0}(x) ===
To show that $c_0(x) = 1$, use the fact that the infinite expansion

$$\prod_{m=1}^\infty \left(1 + x^{2m-1} y^2\right)\left(1 +x^{2m-1}y^{-2}\right)$$

has the following infinite polynomial coefficient at $y^0$

$$=\sum_{m=0}^\infty \frac{x^{2m^2}}{(1-x^2)^2(1-x^4)^2\cdots(1-x^{2m})^2}$$

which is the Durfee square generating function with $x^2$ instead of $x$.

$$=\prod_{m=1}^\infty \left(1 - x^{2m}\right)^{-1}$$

Therefore at $y^0$we have $f_x(y)=1$, and so $c_0(x)=1$.

=== Other proofs ===
A different proof is given by G. E. Andrews based on two identities of Euler.

For the analytic case, see Apostol.
