= Theta constant =

Restriction of a theta function

In mathematics, a theta constant or Thetanullwert (German for theta zero value; plural Thetanullwerte) is the restriction θ_{m}(τ) = θ_{m}(τ,0) of a theta function θ_{m}(τ,z) with rational characteristic m to z = 0. The variable τ may be a complex number in the upper half-plane in which case the theta constants are modular forms, or more generally may be an element of a Siegel upper half plane in which case the theta constants are Siegel modular forms. The theta function of a lattice is essentially a special case of a theta constant.

== Definition ==
The theta function θ_{m}(τ,z) = θ_{a,b}(τ,z) is defined by

$$\theta_{a,b}(\tau,z) = \sum_{\xi\in Z^n} \exp\left[\pi {\rm{i}}(\xi+a)\tau(\xi+a)^t + 2\pi i(\xi+a)(z+b)^t\right]$$

where

- n is a positive integer, called the genus or rank.
- m = (a,b) is called the characteristic
- a,b are in R^{n}
- τ is a complex n by n matrix with positive definite imaginary part
- z is in C^{n}
- t means the transpose of a row vector.

If a,b are in Q^{n} then θ_{a,b}(τ,0) is called a theta constant.

== Examples ==
If n = 1 and a and b are both 0 or 1/2, then the functions θ_{a,b}(τ,z) are the four Jacobi theta functions, and the functions θ_{a,b}(τ,0) are the classical Jacobi theta constants. The theta constant θ_{1/2,1/2}(τ,0) is identically zero, but the other three can be nonzero.
