= Ramanujan theta function =

Mathematical function

In mathematics, particularly q-analog theory, the Ramanujan theta function generalizes the form of the Jacobi theta functions, while capturing their general properties. In particular, the Jacobi triple product takes on a particularly elegant form when written in terms of the Ramanujan theta. The function is named after mathematician Srinivasa Ramanujan.

== Definition ==
The Ramanujan theta function is defined as

$$f(a,b) = \sum_{n=-\infty}^\infty
a^\frac{n(n+1)}{2} \; b^\frac{n(n-1)}{2}$$

for |ab| < 1. The Jacobi triple product identity then takes the form

$$f(a,b) = (-a; ab)_\infty \;(-b; ab)_\infty \;(ab;ab)_\infty.$$

Here, the expression $(a;q)_n$ denotes the q-Pochhammer symbol. Identities that follow from this include

$$\varphi(q) = f(q,q) = \sum_{n=-\infty}^\infty q^{n^2} =
{\left(-q;q^2\right)_\infty^2 \left(q^2;q^2\right)_\infty}$$

and

$$\psi(q) = f\left(q,q^3\right) = \sum_{n=0}^\infty q^\frac{n(n+1)}{2} =
{\left(q^2;q^2\right)_\infty}{(-q; q)_\infty}$$

and

$$f(-q) = f\left(-q,-q^2\right) = \sum_{n=-\infty}^\infty (-1)^n q^\frac{n(3n-1)}{2} =
(q;q)_\infty$$

This last being the Euler function, which is closely related to the Dedekind eta function. The Jacobi theta function may be written in terms of the Ramanujan theta function as:

$$\vartheta_{00}(w, q)=f\left(qw^2,qw^{-2}\right)$$

== Integral representations ==
We have the following integral representation for the full two-parameter form of Ramanujan's theta function:

$$\begin{align}
f(a,b) = 1 + \int_0^{\infty} \frac{2a e^{-\frac12 t^2}}{\sqrt{2\pi}}\left[
\frac{1 - a \sqrt{ab} \cosh\left(\sqrt{\log ab} \,t\right)}{
a^3 b - 2a \sqrt{ab} \cosh\left(\sqrt{\log ab} \,t\right) + 1}
\right] dt  + \\
\int_0^{\infty} \frac{2b e^{-\frac12 t^2}}{\sqrt{2\pi}}\left[
\frac{1 - b \sqrt{ab} \cosh\left(\sqrt{\log ab} \,t\right)}{
a b^3 - 2b \sqrt{ab} \cosh\left(\sqrt{\log ab} \,t\right) + 1}
\right] dt
\end{align}$$

The special cases of Ramanujan's theta functions given by φ(q) := f(q, q) (sequence A000122 in the OEIS) and ψ(q) := f(q, q^{3}) (sequence A010054 in the OEIS) also have the following integral representations:

$$\begin{align}
\varphi(q) & = 1 + \int_0^{\infty} \frac{e^{-\frac12 t^2}}{\sqrt{2\pi}}
\left[\frac{4q \left(1-q^2 \cosh\left(
\sqrt{2 \log q} \,t\right)\right)}{q^4-2 q^2
\cosh\left(\sqrt{2 \log q} \,t\right) + 1}
\right] dt \\[6pt]
\psi(q) & = \int_0^{\infty}
\frac{2 e^{-\frac12 t^2}}{\sqrt{2\pi}}
\left[\frac{1-\sqrt{q}
\cosh\left(\sqrt{\log q} \,t\right)}{q-2 \sqrt{q}
\cosh\left(\sqrt{\log q} \,t\right) + 1}
\right] dt
\end{align}$$

This leads to several special case integrals for constants defined by these functions when q := e^{−kπ} (cf. theta function explicit values). In particular, we have that

$$\begin{align}
\varphi\left(e^{-k\pi}\right) & =
1 + \int_0^\infty \frac{e^{-\frac12 t^2}}{\sqrt{2\pi}} \left[
\frac{4 e^{k\pi} \left(e^{2k\pi} - \cos\left(\sqrt{2\pi k} \,t\right)
\right)}{e^{4k\pi} - 2 e^{2k\pi} \cos\left(\sqrt{2\pi k} \,t\right) + 1}
\right] dt \\[6pt]
\frac{\pi^\frac14}{\Gamma\left(\frac34\right)} & =
1 + \int_0^\infty \frac{e^{-\frac12 t^2}}{\sqrt{2\pi}} \left[
\frac{4 e^\pi \left(e^{2\pi} - \cos\left(\sqrt{2\pi} \,t\right)
\right)}{e^{4\pi} - 2 e^{2\pi} \cos\left(\sqrt{2\pi} \,t\right) + 1}
\right] dt \\[6pt]
\frac{\pi^\frac14}{\Gamma\left(\frac34\right)} \cdot
\frac{\sqrt{2 + \sqrt{2}}}{2} & =
1 + \int_0^\infty \frac{e^{-\frac12 t^2}}{\sqrt{2\pi}} \left[
\frac{4 e^{2\pi} \left(e^{4\pi} - \cos\left(2 \sqrt{\pi} \,t\right)
\right)}{e^{8\pi} - 2 e^{4\pi} \cos\left(2 \sqrt{\pi} \,t\right) + 1}
\right] dt \\[6pt]
\frac{\pi^\frac14}{\Gamma\left(\frac34\right)} \cdot
\frac{\sqrt{1 + \sqrt{3}}}{2^\frac14 3^\frac38} & =
1 + \int_0^\infty \frac{e^{-\frac12 t^2}}{\sqrt{2\pi}} \left[
\frac{4 e^{3\pi} \left(e^{6\pi} - \cos\left(\sqrt{6 \pi} \,t\right)
\right)}{e^{12\pi} - 2 e^{6\pi} \cos\left(\sqrt{6 \pi} \,t\right) + 1}
\right] dt \\[6pt]
\frac{\pi^\frac14}{\Gamma\left(\frac34\right)} \cdot
\frac{\sqrt{5 + 2 \sqrt{5}}}{5^\frac34} & =
1 + \int_0^\infty \frac{e^{-\frac12 t^2}}{\sqrt{2\pi}} \left[
\frac{4 e^{5\pi} \left(e^{10\pi} - \cos\left(\sqrt{10 \pi} \,t\right)
\right)}{e^{20\pi} - 2 e^{10\pi} \cos\left(\sqrt{10 \pi} \,t\right) + 1}
\right] dt
\end{align}$$

and that

$$\begin{align}
\psi\left(e^{-k\pi}\right) & =
\int_0^\infty \frac{e^{-\frac12 t^2}}{\sqrt{2\pi}} \left[
\frac{\cos\left(\sqrt{k \pi} \,t\right) - e^\frac{k\pi}{2}}{
\cos\left(\sqrt{k \pi} \,t\right) - \cosh\frac{k\pi}{2}}
\right] dt \\[6pt]
\frac{\pi^\frac14}{\Gamma\left(\frac34\right)} \cdot
\frac{e^\frac{\pi}{8}}{2^\frac58} & =
\int_0^\infty \frac{e^{-\frac12 t^2}}{\sqrt{2\pi}} \left[
\frac{\cos\left(\sqrt{\pi} \,t\right) - e^\frac{\pi}{2}}{
\cos\left(\sqrt{\pi} \,t\right) - \cosh\frac{\pi}{2}}
\right] dt \\[6pt]
\frac{\pi^\frac14}{\Gamma\left(\frac34\right)} \cdot
\frac{e^\frac{\pi}{4}}{2^\frac54} & =
\int_0^\infty \frac{e^{-\frac12 t^2}}{\sqrt{2\pi}} \left[
\frac{\cos\left(\sqrt{2 \pi} \,t\right) - e^\pi}{
\cos\left(\sqrt{2 \pi} \,t\right) - \cosh \pi}
\right] dt \\[6pt]
\frac{\pi^\frac14}{\Gamma\left(\frac34\right)} \cdot
\frac{\sqrt[4]{1 + \sqrt{2}} \, e^\frac{\pi}{16}}{2^\frac{7}{16}} & =
\int_0^\infty \frac{e^{-\frac12 t^2}}{\sqrt{2\pi}} \left[
\frac{\cos\left(\sqrt{\frac{\pi}{2}} \,t\right) - e^\frac{\pi}{4}}{
\cos\left(\sqrt{\frac{\pi}{2}} \,t\right) - \cosh\frac{\pi}{4}}
\right] dt
\end{align}$$

== Application in string theory ==
The Ramanujan theta function is used to determine the critical dimensions in bosonic string theory, superstring theory and M-theory.
