= SBI ring =

In algebra, an SBI ring is a type of ring R (with identity) such that every idempotent of R modulo the Jacobson radical can be lifted to R. The abbreviation SBI was introduced by Irving Kaplansky and stands for "suitable for building idempotent elements".

== Examples ==
- Any ring with nil radical is SBI.
- Any Banach algebra is SBI: more generally, so is any compact topological ring.
- The ring of rational numbers with odd denominator is not SBI.
