= Jacobi form =

Class of complex vector function

In mathematics, a Jacobi form is an automorphic form on the Jacobi group, which is the semidirect product of the symplectic group Sp(n;R) and the Heisenberg group $H^{(n,h)}_R$. The theory was first systematically studied by Eichler & Zagier (1985).

== Definition ==
A Jacobi form of level 1, weight k and index m is a function $\phi(\tau,z)$ of two complex variables (with τ in the upper half plane) such that

- $\phi\left(\frac{a\tau+b}{c\tau+d},\frac{z}{c\tau+d}\right) = (c\tau+d)^ke^{\frac{2\pi i mcz^2}{c\tau+d}}\phi(\tau,z)\text{ for }{a\ b\choose c\ d}\in \mathrm{SL}_2(\mathbb{Z})$
- $\phi(\tau,z+\lambda\tau+\mu) = e^{-2\pi i m(\lambda^2\tau+2\lambda z)}\phi(\tau,z)$ for all integers λ, μ.
- $\phi$ has a Fourier expansion

$$\phi(\tau,z) = \sum_{n\ge 0} \sum_{r^2\le 4mn} C(n,r)e^{2\pi i (n\tau+rz)}.$$

== Examples ==
Examples in two variables include Jacobi theta functions, the Weierstrass ℘ function, and Fourier–Jacobi coefficients of Siegel modular forms of genus 2. Examples with more than two variables include characters of some irreducible highest-weight representations of affine Kac–Moody algebras. Meromorphic Jacobi forms appear in the theory of Mock modular forms.
