= Elliptic hypergeometric series =

Elliptic analog of hypergeometric series

In mathematics, an elliptic hypergeometric series is a series ${\textstyle \sum c_n}$ such that the ratio ${\textstyle \frac{c_n}{c_{n - 1}}}$ is an elliptic function of $n$, analogous to generalized hypergeometric series where the ratio is a rational function of $n$, and basic hypergeometric series where the ratio is a periodic function of the complex number $n$. They were introduced by Date-Jimbo-Kuniba-Miwa-Okado (1987) and Frenkel & Turaev (1997) in their study of elliptic 6-j symbols.

For surveys of elliptic hypergeometric series see Gasper & Rahman (2004), Spiridonov (2008) or Rosengren (2016).

== Definitions ==
The q-Pochhammer symbol is defined by

$$\displaystyle(a;q)_n = \prod_{k=0}^{n-1} (1-aq^k)=(1-a)(1-aq)(1-aq^2)\cdots(1-aq^{n-1}).$$
$$\displaystyle(a_1,a_2,\ldots,a_m;q)_n = (a_1;q)_n (a_2;q)_n \ldots (a_m;q)_n.$$

The modified Jacobi theta function with argument $x$ and nome $p$ is defined by

$$\displaystyle \theta(x;p)=(x,p/x;p)_\infty$$
$$\displaystyle \theta(x_1,...,x_m;p)=\theta(x_1;p)...\theta(x_m;p)$$

The elliptic shifted factorial is defined by

$$\displaystyle(a;q,p)_n = \theta(a;p)\theta(aq;p)...\theta(aq^{n-1};p)$$
$$\displaystyle(a_1,...,a_m;q,p)_n=(a_1;q,p)_n\cdots(a_m;q,p)_n$$

The theta hypergeometric series ${\textstyle _{r + 1}E_r }$ is defined by

$$\displaystyle{}_{r+1}E_r(a_1,...a_{r+1};b_1,...,b_r;q,p;z) = \sum_{n=0}^\infty\frac{(a_1,...,a_{r+1};q,p)_n}{(q,b_1,...,b_r;q,p)_n}z^n$$

The very well poised theta hypergeometric series ${\textstyle _{r + 1}V_r }$ is defined by

$$\displaystyle{}_{r+1}V_r(a_1;a_6,a_7,...a_{r+1};q,p;z) = \sum_{n=0}^\infty\frac{\theta(a_1q^{2n};p)}{\theta(a_1;p)}\frac{(a_1,a_6,a_7,...,a_{r+1};q,p)_n}{(q,a_1q/a_6,a_1q/a_7,...,a_1q/a_{r+1};q,p)_n}(qz)^n$$

The bilateral theta hypergeometric series ${\textstyle _r G_r }$ is defined by

$$\displaystyle{}_{r}G_r(a_1,...a_{r};b_1,...,b_r;q,p;z) = \sum_{n=-\infty}^\infty\frac{(a_1,...,a_{r};q,p)_n}{(b_1,...,b_r;q,p)_n}z^n$$

== Definitions of additive elliptic hypergeometric series ==
The elliptic numbers are defined by

$$[a;\sigma,\tau]=\frac{\theta_1(\pi\sigma a,e^{\pi i \tau})}{\theta_1(\pi\sigma ,e^{\pi i \tau})}$$

where the Jacobi theta function is defined by

$$\theta_1(x,q) = \sum_{n=-\infty}^\infty (-1)^nq^{(n+1/2)^2}e^{(2n+1)ix}$$

The additive elliptic shifted factorials are defined by

- $[a;\sigma,\tau]_n=[a;\sigma,\tau][a+1;\sigma,\tau]...[a+n-1;\sigma,\tau]$
- $[a_1,...,a_m;\sigma,\tau] = [a_1;\sigma,\tau]...[a_m;\sigma,\tau]$

The additive theta hypergeometric series _{r+1}e_{r} is defined by

$$\displaystyle{}_{r+1}e_r(a_1,...a_{r+1};b_1,...,b_r;\sigma,\tau;z) = \sum_{n=0}^\infty\frac{[a_1,...,a_{r+1};\sigma,\tau]_n}{[1,b_1,...,b_r;\sigma,\tau]_n}z^n$$

The additive very well poised theta hypergeometric series _{r+1}v_{r} is defined by

$$\displaystyle{}_{r+1}v_r(a_1;a_6,...a_{r+1};\sigma,\tau;z) = \sum_{n=0}^\infty\frac{[a_1+2n;\sigma,\tau]}{[a_1;\sigma,\tau]}\frac{[a_1,a_6,...,a_{r+1};\sigma,\tau]_n}{[1,1+a_1-a_6,...,1+a_1-a_{r+1};\sigma,\tau]_n}z^n$$
