= Theta function of a lattice =

In mathematics, the theta function of a lattice is a function whose coefficients give the number of vectors of a given norm.

== Definition ==
One can associate to any (positive-definite) lattice Λ a theta function given by

$$\Theta_\Lambda(\tau) = \sum_{x\in\Lambda}e^{i\pi\tau\|x\|^2}\qquad\mathrm{Im}\,\tau > 0.$$

The theta function of a lattice is then a holomorphic function on the upper half-plane. Furthermore, the theta function of an even unimodular lattice of rank n is actually a modular form of weight n/2. The theta function of an integral lattice is often written as a power series in $q = e^{2i\pi\tau}$ so that the coefficient of q^{n} gives the number of lattice vectors of norm 2n.

== See also ==
- Siegel theta series
- Theta constant
