= Hilbert modular form =

Special modular forms

In mathematics, a Hilbert modular form is a generalization of modular forms to functions of two or more variables. It is a (complex) analytic function on the m-fold product of upper half-planes $\mathcal{H}$ satisfying a certain kind of functional equation.

== Definition ==
Let F be a totally real number field of degree m over the rational field. Let $\sigma_1, \ldots, \sigma_m$ be the real embeddings of F. Through them we have a map

$$GL_2(F) \to GL_2(\R)^m$$

sending $\gamma$ to $(\sigma_1(\gamma),\ldots,\sigma_m(\gamma)).$ Let $\mathcal O_F$ be the ring of integers of F. The group $GL_2^+(\mathcal O_F)$ of matrices with totally positive determinant is called the full Hilbert modular group. There is a group action of $GL_2^+ (\mathcal O_F)$ on $\mathcal{H}^m$ defined by $\gamma \cdot (z_1, \ldots, z_m) = (\sigma_1(\gamma) z_1, \ldots, \sigma_m(\gamma) z_m)$.

For

$$g = \begin{pmatrix}a & b \\ c & d \end{pmatrix} \in GL_2(\R),$$

define:

$$j(g, z) = \det(g)^{-1/2} (cz+d)$$

A Hilbert modular form of weight $(k_1,\ldots,k_m)$ is an analytic function on $\mathcal{H}^m$ such that for every $\gamma \in GL_2^+(\mathcal O_F)$

$$f(\gamma z) = \prod_{i=1}^m j(\sigma_i(\gamma), z_i)^{k_i} f(z).$$

If $F=\mathbb{Q}$ then one has to also add an extra boundedness condition at the cusps; however for larger fields $F$ this condition is automatically satisfied because of Koecher's principle.

== History ==
These modular forms, for real quadratic fields, were first treated in the 1901 Göttingen University Habilitationsschrift of Otto Blumenthal. There he mentions that David Hilbert had considered them initially in work from 1893-4, which remained unpublished. Blumenthal's work was published in 1903. For this reason Hilbert modular forms are now often called Hilbert-Blumenthal modular forms.

The theory remained dormant for some decades; Erich Hecke appealed to it in his early work, but major interest in Hilbert modular forms awaited the development of complex manifold theory.

== See also ==
- Siegel modular form
- Hilbert modular surface
