= Ikeda lift =

In mathematics, the Ikeda lift is a lifting of modular forms to Siegel modular forms. The existence of the lifting was conjectured by W. Duke and Ö. Imamoḡlu and also by T. Ibukiyama, and the lifting was constructed by Ikeda (2001). It generalized the Saito–Kurokawa lift from modular forms of weight 2k to genus 2 Siegel modular forms of weight k + 1.

== Statement ==
Suppose that k and n are positive integers of the same parity. The Ikeda lift takes a Hecke eigenform of weight 2k for SL_{2}(Z) to a Hecke eigenform in the space of Siegel modular forms of weight k+n, degree 2n.

== Example ==
The Ikeda lift takes the Delta function (the weight 12 cusp form for SL_{2}(Z)) to the Schottky form, a weight 8 Siegel cusp form of degree 4. Here k=6 and n=2.
