= Siegel modular form =

Major type of automorphic form in mathematics

In mathematics, Siegel modular forms are a type of automorphic form that generalize conventional elliptic modular forms, which are closely related to elliptic curves. The complex manifolds constructed in the theory of Siegel modular forms are Siegel modular varieties, which are basic models for what a moduli space for abelian varieties (with some extra level structure) should be and are constructed as quotients of the Siegel upper half-space, rather than the upper half-plane by discrete groups.

Siegel modular forms are holomorphic functions on the set of symmetric $n\times n$ matrices with positive definite imaginary part; the forms must satisfy an automorphy condition. Siegel modular forms can be thought of as multivariable modular forms, i.e. as special functions of several complex variables.

Siegel modular forms are named after Carl Ludwig Siegel, who first investigated them for the purpose of studying quadratic forms analytically. These primarily arise in various branches of number theory, such as arithmetic geometry and elliptic cohomology. Siegel modular forms have also been used in some areas of physics, such as conformal field theory and black hole thermodynamics in string theory.

== Definition ==
=== Preliminaries ===
Let $g, N \in \mathbb{N}$ and define the Siegel upper half-space

$$\mathcal{H}_g=\left\{\tau \in M_{g \times g}(\mathbb{C}) \ \big| \ \tau^{\mathrm{T}}=\tau,\; \textrm{Im}(\tau) \text{  positive definite} \right\}.$$

Define the symplectic group of level $N$, denoted by $\Gamma_g(N),$ as

$$\Gamma_g(N)=\left\{ \gamma \in GL_{2g}(\mathbb{Z}) \ \big| \ \gamma^{\mathrm{T}} \begin{pmatrix} 0 & I_g \\ -I_g & 0 \end{pmatrix} \gamma= \begin{pmatrix} 0 & I_g \\ -I_g & 0 \end{pmatrix} , \ \gamma \equiv I_{2g}\!\!\!\mod N\right\},$$

where $I_g$ is the $g \times g$ identity matrix. Finally, let

$$\rho:\textrm{GL}_g(\mathbb{C}) \rightarrow \textrm{GL}(V)$$

be a rational representation, where $V$ is a finite-dimensional complex vector space.

=== Siegel modular form ===
Given a matrix

$$\gamma=\begin{pmatrix} A & B \\ C & D \end{pmatrix}$$

and $\gamma \in \Gamma_g(N)$, define

$$(f\,\vert\,\gamma)(\tau)=(\rho(C\tau+D))^{-1}f(\gamma\tau).$$

Then a holomorphic function $f:\mathcal{H}_g \rightarrow V$ is called a Siegel modular form of degree (or genus) $g$, weight $\rho$, and level $N$ if

$$(f\,\vert\,\gamma)=f$$

for all $\gamma \in \Gamma_g(N)$. In the case that $g=1$, we further require that $f$ be holomorphic "at infinity". This assumption is not necessary for $g>1$ due to the Koecher principle, explained below.

The space of weight $\rho$, degree $g$, and level $N$ Siegel modular forms is denoted by $M_{\rho}(\Gamma_g(N))$.

== Examples ==
Some methods for constructing Siegel modular forms include:

- Eisenstein series
- Theta functions of lattices and Siegel theta series
- Saito–Kurokawa lift for degree 2
- Ikeda lift
- Miyawaki lift
- Products of Siegel modular forms.

=== Level 1, small degree ===
For degree 1, the level 1 Siegel modular forms are the same as level 1 modular forms. The ring of such forms is a polynomial ring C[E_{4},E_{6}] in the (degree 1) Eisenstein series E_{4} and E_{6}.

For degree 2, Jun-ichi Igusa showed that the ring of level 1 Siegel modular forms is generated by the (degree 2) Eisenstein series E_{4} and E_{6} and 3 more forms of weights 10, 12, and 35. The ideal of relations between them is generated by the square of the weight 35 form minus a certain polynomial in the others.

For degree 3, Tsuyumine described the ring of level 1 Siegel modular forms, giving a set of 34 generators.

For degree 4, the level 1 Siegel modular forms of small weights have been found. There are no cusp forms of weights 2, 4, or 6. The space of cusp forms of weight 8 is 1-dimensional, spanned by the Schottky form. The space of cusp forms of weight 10 has dimension 1, the space of cusp forms of weight 12 has dimension 2, the space of cusp forms of weight 14 has dimension 3, and the space of cusp forms of weight 16 has dimension 7 (Poor & Yuen 2007).

For degree 5, the space of cusp forms has dimension 0 for weight 10, dimension 2 for weight 12. The space of forms of weight 12 has dimension 5.

For degree 6, there are no cusp forms of weights 0, 2, 4, 6, 8. The space of Siegel modular forms of weight 2 has dimension 0, and those of weights 4 or 6 both have dimension 1.

=== Level 1, small weight ===
For small weights and level 1, we have the following results (for any positive degree):

- Weight 0: The space of forms is 1-dimensional, spanned by 1.
- Weight 1: The only Siegel modular form is 0.
- Weight 2: The only Siegel modular form is 0.
- Weight 3: The only Siegel modular form is 0.
- Weight 4: For any degree, the space of forms of weight 4 is 1-dimensional, spanned by the theta function of the E_{8} lattice (of appropriate degree). The only cusp form is 0.
- Weight 5: The only Siegel modular form is 0.
- Weight 6: The space of forms of weight 6 has dimension 1 if the degree is at most 8, and dimension 0 if the degree is at least 9. The only cusp form is 0.
- Weight 7: The space of cusp forms vanishes if the degree is 4 or 7.
- Weight 8:In genus 4, the space of cusp forms is 1-dimensional, spanned by the Schottky form and the space of forms is 2-dimensional. There are no cusp forms if the genus is 8.
- There are no cusp forms if the genus is greater than twice the weight.

=== Table of dimensions of spaces of level 1 Siegel modular forms ===
The following table combines the results above with information from Poor & Yuen (2006) and Chenevier & Lannes (2015) and Taïbi (2017).

Dimensions of spaces of level 1 Siegel cusp forms: Siegel modular forms
Weight	degree 0	degree 1	degree 2	degree 3	degree 4	degree 5	degree 6	degree 7	degree 8	degree 9	degree 10	degree 11	degree 12
0	1: 1	0: 1	0: 1	0: 1	0: 1	0: 1	0: 1	0: 1	0: 1	0: 1	0: 1	0: 1	0: 1
2	1: 1	0: 0	0: 0	0: 0	0: 0	0: 0	0: 0	0: 0	0: 0	0: 0	0: 0	0: 0	0: 0
4	1: 1	0: 1	0: 1	0: 1	0: 1	0: 1	0: 1	0: 1	0: 1	0: 1	0: 1	0: 1	0: 1
6	1: 1	0: 1	0: 1	0: 1	0: 1	0: 1	0: 1	0: 1	0: 1	0: 0	0: 0	0: 0	0: 0
8	1: 1	0: 1	0: 1	0:1	1: 2	0: 2	0: 2	0: 2	0: 2	0:	0:	0:	0:
10	1: 1	0: 1	1: 2	0: 2	1: 3	0: 3	1: 4	0: 4	1:	0:	0:	0:	0:
12	1: 1	1: 2	1: 3	1: 4	2: 6	2: 8	3: 11	3: 14	4: 18	2:20	2: 22	1: 23	1: 24
14	1: 1	0: 1	1: 2	1: 3	3:6	3: 9	9: 18	9: 27					
16	1: 1	1: 2	2: 4	3: 7	7: 14	13:27	33:60	83:143					
18	1: 1	1: 2	2: 4	4:8	12:20	28: 48	117: 163						
20	1: 1	1: 2	3: 5	6: 11	22: 33	76: 109	486:595						
22	1: 1	1: 2	4: 6	9:15	38:53	186:239							
24	1: 1	2: 3	5: 8	14: 22									
26	1: 1	1: 2	5: 7	17: 24									
28	1: 1	2: 3	7: 10	27: 37									
30	1: 1	2: 3	8: 11	34: 45									

== Koecher principle ==
The theorem known as the Koecher principle states that if $f$ is a Siegel modular form of weight $\rho$, level 1, and degree $g>1$, then $f$ is bounded on subsets of $\mathcal{H}_g$ of the form

$$\left\{\tau \in \mathcal{H}_g \mid \textrm{Im}(\tau) > \epsilon I_g \right\},$$

where $\epsilon>0$. Corollary to this theorem is the fact that Siegel modular forms of degree $g>1$ have Fourier expansions and are thus holomorphic at infinity.

== Applications to physics ==
In the D1D5P system of supersymmetric black holes in string theory, the function that naturally captures the microstates of black hole entropy is a Siegel modular form. In general, Siegel modular forms have been described as having the potential to describe black holes or other gravitational systems.

Siegel modular forms also have uses as generating functions for families of CFT2 with increasing central charge in conformal field theory, particularly the hypothetical AdS/CFT correspondence.
