= Jacobi theta functions (notational variations) =

There are a number of notational systems for the Jacobi theta functions. The notations given in the Wikipedia article define the original function

$$\vartheta_{00}(z; \tau) = \sum_{n=-\infty}^\infty \exp (\pi i n^2 \tau + 2 \pi i n z)$$

which is equivalent to

$$\vartheta_{00}(w, q) = \sum_{n=-\infty}^\infty q^{n^2} w^{2n}$$

where $q=e^{\pi i\tau}$ and $w=e^{\pi iz}$.

However, a similar notation is defined somewhat differently in Whittaker and Watson, p. 487:

$$\vartheta_{0,0}(x) = \sum_{n=-\infty}^\infty q^{n^2} \exp (2 \pi i n x/a)$$

This notation is attributed to "Hermite, H.J.S. Smith and some other mathematicians". They also define

$$\vartheta_{1,1}(x) = \sum_{n=-\infty}^\infty (-1)^n q^{(n+1/2)^2} \exp (\pi i (2 n + 1) x/a)$$

This is a factor of i off from the definition of $\vartheta_{11}$ as defined in the Wikipedia article. These definitions can be made at least proportional by x = za, but other definitions cannot. Whittaker and Watson, Abramowitz and Stegun, and Gradshteyn and Ryzhik all follow Tannery and Molk, in which

$$\vartheta_1(z) = -i \sum_{n=-\infty}^\infty (-1)^n q^{(n+1/2)^2} \exp ((2 n + 1) i z)$$
$$\vartheta_2(z) = \sum_{n=-\infty}^\infty q^{(n+1/2)^2} \exp ((2 n + 1) i z)$$
$$\vartheta_3(z) = \sum_{n=-\infty}^\infty q^{n^2} \exp (2 n i z)$$
$$\vartheta_4(z) = \sum_{n=-\infty}^\infty (-1)^n q^{n^2} \exp (2 n i z)$$

Note that there is no factor of π in the argument as in the previous definitions.

Whittaker and Watson refer to still other definitions of $\vartheta_j$. The warning in Abramowitz and Stegun, "There is a bewildering variety of notations...in consulting books caution should be exercised," may be viewed as an understatement. In any expression, an occurrence of $\vartheta(z)$ should not be assumed to have any particular definition. It is incumbent upon the author to state what definition of $\vartheta(z)$ is intended.
