= Hilbert modular variety =

Algebraic surface in mathematics

In mathematics, a Hilbert modular surface or Hilbert–Blumenthal surface is an algebraic surface obtained by taking a quotient of a product of two copies of the upper half-plane by a Hilbert modular group. More generally, a Hilbert modular variety is an algebraic variety obtained by taking a quotient of a product of multiple copies of the upper half-plane by a Hilbert modular group.

Hilbert modular surfaces were first described by Otto Blumenthal (1903, 1904) using some unpublished notes written by David Hilbert about 10 years before.

== Definitions ==
If R is the ring of integers of a real quadratic field, then the Hilbert modular group SL_{2}(R) acts on the product H×H of two copies of the upper half plane H. There are several birationally equivalent surfaces related to this action, any of which may be called Hilbert modular surfaces:

- The surface X is the quotient of H×H by SL_{2}(R); it is not compact and usually has quotient singularities coming from points with non-trivial isotropy groups.
- The surface X^{*} is obtained from X by adding a finite number of points corresponding to the cusps of the action. It is compact, and has not only the quotient singularities of X, but also singularities at its cusps.
- The surface Y is obtained from X^{*} by resolving the singularities in a minimal way. It is a compact smooth algebraic surface, but is not in general minimal.
- The surface Y^{0} is obtained from Y by blowing down certain exceptional −1-curves. It is smooth and compact, and is often (but not always) minimal.

There are several variations of this construction:

- The Hilbert modular group may be replaced by some subgroup of finite index, such as a congruence subgroup.
- One can extend the Hilbert modular group by a group of order 2, acting on the Hilbert modular group via the Galois action, and exchanging the two copies of the upper half plane.

== Singularities ==
Hirzebruch (1953) showed how to resolve the quotient singularities, and Hirzebruch (1971) showed how to resolve their cusp singularities.

== Properties ==
Hilbert modular varieties cannot be anabelian.

== Classification of surfaces ==
The papers Hirzebruch (1971), Hirzebruch & Van de Ven (1974) and Hirzebruch & Zagier (1977) identified their type in the classification of algebraic surfaces. Most of them are surfaces of general type, but several are rational surfaces or blown up K3 surfaces or elliptic surfaces.

== Examples ==
van der Geer (1988) gives a long table of examples.

The Clebsch surface blown up at its 10 Eckardt points is a Hilbert modular surface.

=== Associated to a quadratic field extension ===
Given a quadratic field extension $K = \mathbb{Q}(\sqrt{p})$ for $p = 4k + 1$ there is an associated Hilbert modular variety $Y(p)$ obtained from compactifying a certain quotient variety $X(p)$ and resolving its singularities. Let $\mathfrak{H}$ denote the upper half plane and let $SL(2,\mathcal{O}_K)/\{\pm \text{Id}_2\}$ act on $\mathfrak{H}\times \mathfrak{H}$ via

$$\begin{pmatrix}
a & b \\
c & d
\end{pmatrix} (z_1,z_2) = \left( \frac{
az_1 + bz_2
}{
cz_1 + dz_2
}, \frac{
a'z_1 + b'z_2
}{
c'z_1 + d'z_2
}\right)$$

where the $a',b',c',d'$ are the Galois conjugates. The associated quotient variety is denoted

$X(p) = G\backslash \mathfrak{H}\times\mathfrak{H}$

and can be compactified to a variety $\overline{X}(p)$, called the cusps, which are in bijection with the ideal classes in $\text{Cl}(\mathcal{O}_K)$. Resolving its singularities gives the variety $Y(p)$ called the Hilbert modular variety of the field extension. From the Bailey-Borel compactification theorem, there is an embedding of this surface into a projective space.

== See also ==
- Hilbert modular form
- Picard modular surface
- Siegel modular variety
