= Contorsion tensor =

Object in differential geometry

The contorsion tensor (or contortion tensor) in differential geometry is the difference between a connection with and without torsion in it. It commonly appears in the study of spin connections. Thus, for example, a vielbein together with a spin connection, when subject to the condition of vanishing torsion, gives a description of Einstein gravity. For supersymmetry, the same constraint, of vanishing torsion, gives (the field equations of) eleven-dimensional supergravity. That is, the contorsion tensor, along with the connection, becomes one of the dynamical objects of the theory, demoting the metric to a secondary, derived role.

The elimination of torsion in a connection is referred to as the absorption of torsion, and is one of the steps of Cartan's equivalence method for establishing the equivalence of geometric structures.

== Definition in metric geometry ==
In metric geometry, the contorsion tensor expresses the difference between a metric-compatible affine connection with Christoffel symbol ${\Gamma^{k}}_{ij}$ and the unique torsion-free Levi-Civita connection for the same metric.

The contorsion tensor $K_{kji}$ is defined in terms of the torsion tensor, so the latter tensor's definition is important:

$${T^{l}}_{ij}= {\Gamma^{l}}_{ij} -{\Gamma^{l}}_{ji}$$

Notice that the torsion tensor is antisymmetric in its last two indices. Now the contorsion tensor can be defined, and it is obviously antisymmetric in its first two indices:

$$K_{ijk} =  \tfrac{1}{2} (T_{ijk} - T_{jik} - T_{kij})$$

where the indices are being raised and lowered with respect to the metric:

$$T_{ijk} \equiv  g_{il} {T^{l}}_{jk}$$.

The reason for the non-obvious sum in the definition of the contorsion tensor is due to the sum-sum difference that enforces metric compatibility. The full metric compatible affine connection can be written as:

$${\Gamma^{l}}_{ij} =\bar\Gamma^{l}{}{}_{ij} + {K^{l}}_{ij},$$

where $\bar\Gamma^{l}{}{}_{ji}$ is the torsion-free Levi-Civita connection:

$$\bar\Gamma^{l}{}{}_{ji} = \tfrac{1}{2} g^{lk} (\partial_{i}g_{jk} + \partial_{j}g_{ki} - \partial_{k}g_{ij})$$

Because the contorsion tensor is antisymmetric in its first two indices (not necessarily its last two indices), the contorsion tensor will typically add (to the Levi-Civita connection) not just a term that is antisymmetric in "i" and "j", but will also add a term that is symmetric in "i" and "j".

== Definition in affine geometry ==
In affine geometry, one does not have a metric nor a metric connection, and so one is not free to raise and lower indices on demand. One can still achieve a similar effect by making use of the solder form, allowing the bundle to be related to what is happening on its base space. This is an explicitly geometric viewpoint, with tensors now being geometric objects in the vertical and horizontal bundles of a fiber bundle, instead of being indexed algebraic objects defined only on the base space. In this case, one may construct a contorsion tensor, living as a one-form on the tangent bundle.

Recall that the torsion of a connection $\omega$ can be expressed as

$$\Theta_\omega = D\theta = d\theta + \omega \wedge \theta$$

where $\theta$ is the solder form (tautological one-form). The subscript $\omega$ serves only as a reminder that this torsion tensor was obtained from the connection.

By analogy to the lowering of the index on torsion tensor on the section above, one can perform a similar operation with the solder form, and construct a tensor

$$\Sigma_\omega(X,Y,Z)=\langle\theta(Z), \Theta_\omega(X,Y)\rangle +
\langle\theta(Y), \Theta_\omega(Z,X)\rangle
- \langle\theta(X), \Theta_\omega(Y,Z)\rangle$$

Here $\langle,\rangle$ is the scalar product. This tensor can be expressed as

$$\Sigma_\omega(X,Y,Z)=2\langle\theta(Z), \sigma_\omega(X)\theta(Y)\rangle$$

The quantity $\sigma_\omega$ is the contorsion form and is exactly what is needed to add to an arbitrary connection to get the torsion-free Levi-Civita connection. That is, given an Ehresmann connection $\omega$, there is another connection $\omega+\sigma_\omega$ that is torsion-free.

The vanishing of the torsion is then equivalent to having

$$\Theta_{\omega+\sigma_\omega} = 0$$

or

$$d\theta = - (\omega +\sigma_\omega) \wedge \theta$$

This can be viewed as a field equation relating the dynamics of the connection to that of the contorsion tensor.

== Derivation ==
One way to quickly derive a metric compatible affine connection is to repeat the sum-sum difference idea used in the derivation of the Levi–Civita connection but not take torsion to be zero. Below is a derivation.

Convention for derivation (Choose to define connection coefficients this way. The motivation is that of connection-one forms in gauge theory):

$$\nabla_{i}v^{j} = \partial_{i}v^{j} + {\Gamma^{j}}_{ki} v^{k},$$

$$\nabla_{i}\omega_{j} = \partial_{i}\omega_{j} - {\Gamma^{k}}_{ji} \omega_{k},$$

We begin with the Metric Compatible condition:

$$\nabla_{i}g_{jk} = \partial_{i}g_{jk} - {\Gamma^{l}}_{ji}g_{lk} - {\Gamma^{l}}_{ki}g_{jl} = 0,$$

Now we use sum-sum difference (Cycle the indices on the condition):

$$\partial_{i}g_{jk} - {\Gamma^{l}}_{ji}g_{lk} - {\Gamma^{l}}_{ki}g_{jl} + \partial_{j}g_{ki} - {\Gamma^{l}}_{kj}g_{li} - {\Gamma^{l}}_{ij}g_{kl} - \partial_{k}g_{ij} + {\Gamma^{l}}_{ik}g_{lj} + {\Gamma^{l}}_{jk}g_{il} = 0$$

$$\partial_{i}g_{jk} + \partial_{j}g_{ki} - \partial_{k}g_{ij} - \Gamma_{kji} - \Gamma_{jki}  - \Gamma_{ikj} - \Gamma_{kij} + \Gamma_{jik} + \Gamma_{ijk} = 0$$

We now use the below torsion tensor definition (for a holonomic frame) to rewrite the connection:

$${T^k}_{ij}= {\Gamma^k}_{ij} - {\Gamma^k}_{ji}$$
$$\Gamma_{kij} = T_{kij} + \Gamma_{kji}$$

Note that this definition of torsion has the opposite sign as the usual definition when using the above convention $\nabla_{i}v^{j} = \partial_{i}v^{j} + {\Gamma^{j}}_{ki} v^{k}$ for the lower index ordering of the connection coefficients, i.e. it has the opposite sign as the coordinate-free definition $\Theta_\omega = D\theta$ in the below section on geometry. Rectifying this inconsistency (which seems to be common in the literature) would result in a contorsion tensor with the opposite sign.

Substitute the torsion tensor definition into what we have:

$$\partial_{i}g_{jk} + \partial_{j}g_{ki} - \partial_{k}g_{ij} - (T_{kji} + \Gamma_{kij}) - \Gamma_{jki}  - (T_{ikj} + \Gamma_{ijk}) - \Gamma_{kij} + (T_{jik} + \Gamma_{jki}) + \Gamma_{ijk} = 0$$

Clean it up and combine like terms

$$2\Gamma_{kij} = \partial_{i}g_{jk} + \partial_{j}g_{ki} - \partial_{k}g_{ij} - T_{kji} - T_{ikj} + T_{jik}$$

The torsion terms combine to make an object that transforms tensorially. Since these terms combine together in a metric compatible fashion, they are given a name, the Contorsion tensor, which determines the skew-symmetric part of a metric compatible affine connection.

We will define it here with the motivation that it match the indices of the left hand side of the equation above.

$$K_{kij} =  \tfrac{1}{2} (- T_{kji} - T_{ikj} + T_{jik})$$

Cleaning by using the anti-symmetry of the torsion tensor yields what we will define to be the contorsion tensor:

$$K_{kij} =  \tfrac{1}{2} (T_{kij} + T_{ijk} - T_{jki})$$

Subbing this back into our expression, we have:

$$2\Gamma_{kij} = \partial_{i}g_{jk} + \partial_{j}g_{ki} - \partial_{k}g_{ij} + 2 K_{kij}$$

Now isolate the connection coefficients, and group the torsion terms together:

$${\Gamma^{l}}_{ij} = \tfrac{1}{2} g^{lk} (\partial_{i}g_{jk} + \partial_{j}g_{ki} - \partial_{k}g_{ij}) + \tfrac{1}{2} g^{lk} (2 K_{kij})$$

Recall that the first term with the partial derivatives is the Levi-Civita connection expression used often by relativists.

Following suit, define the following to be the torsion-free Levi-Civita connection:

$$\bar\Gamma^{l}{}{}_{ij} = \tfrac{1}{2} g^{lk} (\partial_{i}g_{jk} + \partial_{j}g_{ki} - \partial_{k}g_{ij})$$

Then we have that the full metric compatible affine connection can now be written as:

$${\Gamma^{l}}_{ij} =\bar\Gamma^{l}{}{}_{ij} + {K^{l}}_{ij},$$

== Relationship to teleparallelism ==
In the theory of teleparallelism, one encounters a connection, the Weitzenböck connection, which is flat (vanishing Riemann curvature) but has a non-vanishing torsion. The flatness is exactly what allows parallel frame fields to be constructed. These notions can be extended to supermanifolds.

== See also ==
- Belinfante–Rosenfeld stress–energy tensor
