= Solder form =

Mathematical construct of fiber bundles

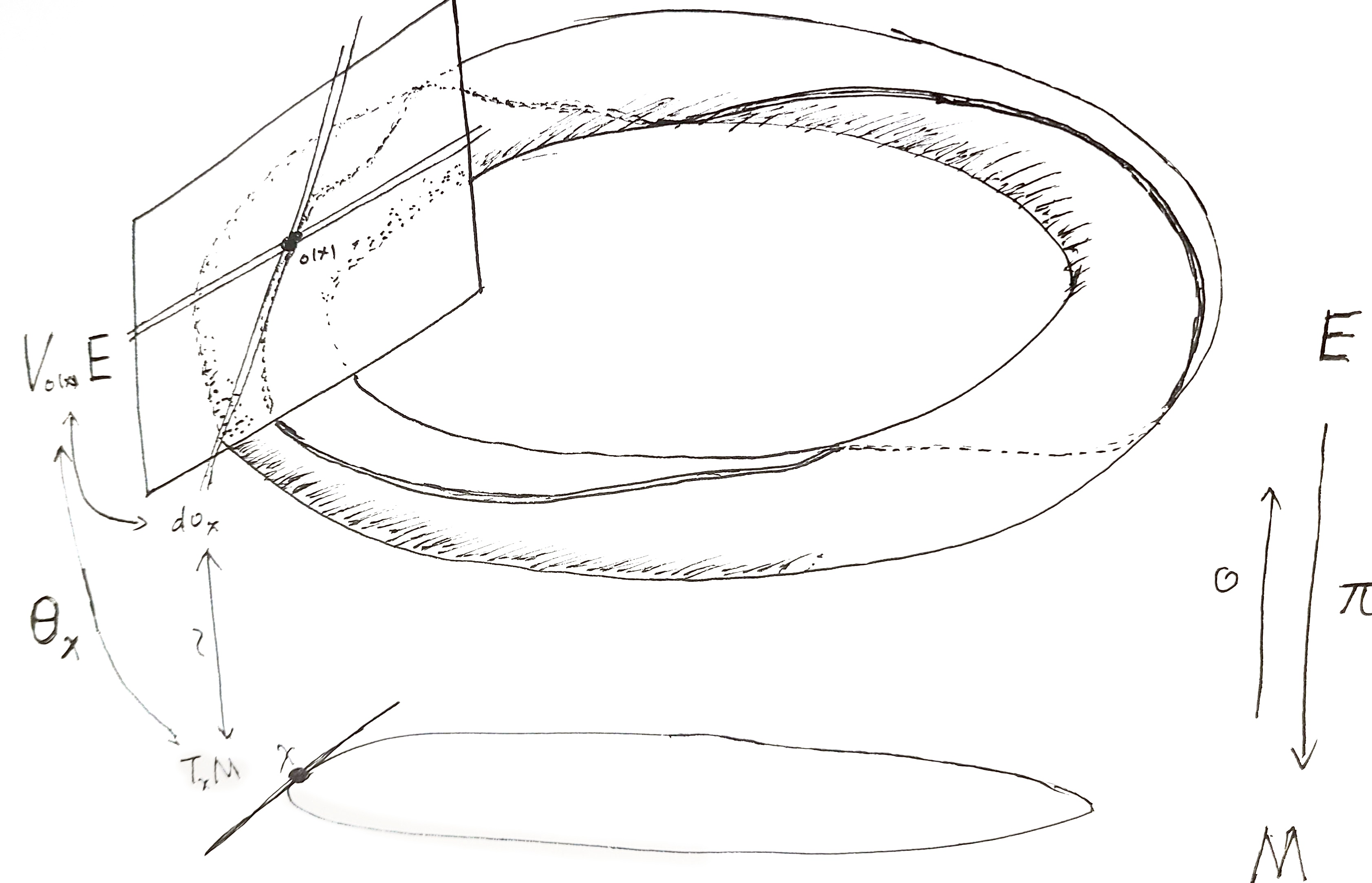
Solder form of a circle over a torus. The torus is a circle bundle over the circle. The distinguished section o wraps the circle around the torus twice. The solder form can then be pictured as grabbing each circle-fiber $\pi^{-1}(x)$ at the distinguished base-point $o(x)$, and rotating and stretching it, so that it exactly matches $M$ at $x$ at least infinitesimally.

In mathematics, more precisely in differential geometry, a soldering (or sometimes solder form) of a fiber bundle to a smooth manifold is a manner of attaching the fibers to the manifold in such a way that they can be regarded as tangent. Intuitively, soldering expresses in abstract terms the idea that a manifold may have a point of contact with a certain model Klein geometry at each point. In extrinsic differential geometry, the soldering is simply expressed by the tangency of the model space to the manifold. In intrinsic geometry, other techniques are needed to express it. Soldering was introduced in this general form by Charles Ehresmann in 1950.

== Soldering of a fibre bundle ==
Let M be a smooth manifold, and G a Lie group, and let E be a smooth fibre bundle over M with structure group G. Suppose that G acts transitively on the typical fibre F of E, and that dim F = dim M. A soldering of E to M consists of the following data:

1. A distinguished section o : M → E.
2. A linear isomorphism of vector bundles θ : TM → o^{*}VE from the tangent bundle of M to the pullback of the vertical bundle of E along the distinguished section, where the pullback bundle is defined as o^{*}VE = M × VE.

In particular, this latter condition can be interpreted as saying that θ determines a linear isomorphism

$$\theta_x : T_xM\rightarrow V_{o(x)} E$$

from the tangent space of M at x to the (vertical) tangent space of the fibre at the point determined by the distinguished section. The form θ is called the solder form for the soldering.

== Special cases ==
By convention, whenever the choice of soldering is unique or canonically determined, the solder form is called the canonical form, or the tautological form.

=== Affine bundles and vector bundles ===
Suppose that E is an affine vector bundle (a vector bundle without a choice of zero section). Then a soldering on E specifies first a distinguished section: that is, a choice of zero section o, so that E may be identified as a vector bundle. The solder form is then a linear isomorphism

$$\theta\colon TM \to V_oE,$$

However, for a vector bundle there is a canonical isomorphism between the vertical space at the origin and the fibre V_{o}E ≈ E. Making this identification, the solder form is specified by a linear isomorphism

$$TM \to E.$$

In other words, a soldering on an affine bundle E is a choice of isomorphism of E with the tangent bundle of M.

Often one speaks of a solder form on a vector bundle, where it is understood a priori that the distinguished section of the soldering is the zero section of the bundle. In this case, the structure group of the vector bundle is often implicitly enlarged by the semidirect product of GL(n) with the typical fibre of E (which is a representation of GL(n)).

==== Examples ====
- As a special case, for instance, the tangent bundle itself carries a canonical solder form, namely the identity.
- If M has a Riemannian metric (or pseudo-Riemannian metric), then the covariant metric tensor gives an isomorphism $g\colon TM \to T^*M$ from the tangent bundle to the cotangent bundle, which is a solder form.
- In Hamiltonian mechanics, the solder form is known as the tautological one-form, or alternately as the Liouville one-form, the Poincaré one-form, the canonical one-form, or the symplectic potential.
- Consider the Mobius strip as a fiber bundle over the circle. The vertical bundle o^{*}VE is still a Mobius strip, while the tangent bundle TM is the cylinder, so there is no solder form for this.

==== Applications ====
- A solder form on a vector bundle allows one to define the torsion and contorsion tensors of a connection.
- Solder forms occur in the sigma model, where they glue together the tangent space of a spacetime manifold to the tangent space of the field manifold.
- Vierbeins, or tetrads in general relativity, look like solder forms, in that they glue together coordinate charts on the spacetime manifold, to the preferred, usually orthonormal basis on the tangent space, where calculations can be considerably simplified. That is, the coordinate charts are the $TM$ in the definitions above, and the frame field is the vertical bundle $VE$. In the sigma model, the vierbeins are explicitly the solder forms.

=== Principal bundles ===
In the language of principal bundles, a solder form on a smooth principal G-bundle P over a smooth manifold M is a horizontal and G-equivariant differential 1-form on P with values in a linear representation V of G such that the associated bundle map from the tangent bundle TM to the associated bundle P×_{G} V is a bundle isomorphism. (In particular, V and M must have the same dimension.)

A motivating example of a solder form is the tautological or fundamental form on the frame bundle of a manifold.

The reason for the name is that a solder form solders (or attaches) the abstract principal bundle to the manifold M by identifying an associated bundle with the tangent bundle. Solder forms provide a method for studying G-structures and are important in the theory of Cartan connections. The terminology and approach is particularly popular in the physics literature.
