= Torsion tensor =

Object in differential geometry

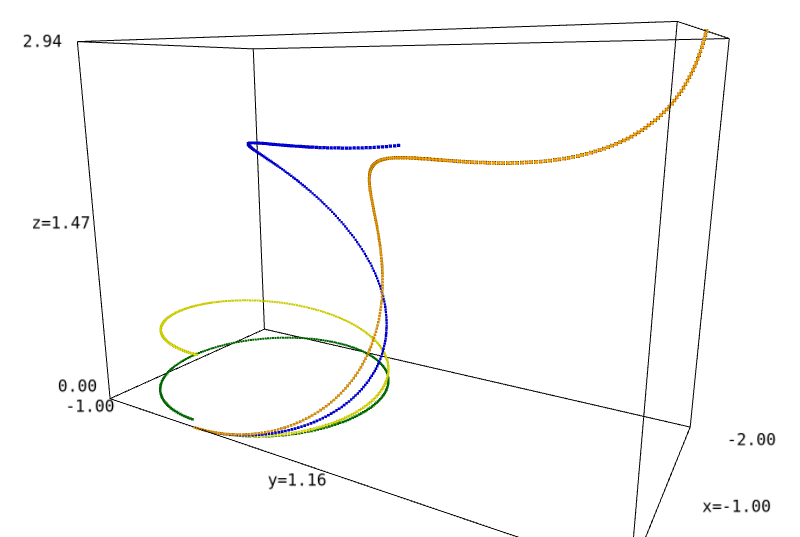
Development of the unit circle in the Euclidean space $\mathbb R^3$, with four different choices of flat connection preserving the Euclidean metric, defined by $\nabla_{e_i}e_j=\tau\,e_i\times e_j$, where $\tau$ is a constant scalar, respectively: $\tau = 0.01, 0.1, 0.5, 1.0$. The resulting curves all have arc length $2\pi$, curvature $1$, and respective torsion $\tau$ (in the sense of Frenet-Serret).

In differential geometry, the torsion tensor is a tensor that is associated to any affine connection. The torsion tensor is a bilinear map of two input vectors $X,Y$, that produces an output vector $T(X,Y)$ representing the displacement within a tangent space when the tangent space is developed (or "rolled") along an infinitesimal parallelogram whose sides are $X,Y$. It is skew symmetric in its inputs, because developing over the parallelogram in the opposite sense produces the opposite displacement, similarly to how a screw moves in opposite ways when it is twisted in two directions.

Torsion is particularly useful in the study of the geometry of geodesics. Given a system of parametrized geodesics, one can specify a class of affine connections having those geodesics, but differing by their torsions. There is a unique connection which absorbs the torsion, generalizing the Levi-Civita connection to other, possibly non-metric situations (such as Finsler geometry). The difference between a connection with torsion, and a corresponding connection without torsion is a tensor, called the contorsion tensor. Absorption of torsion also plays a fundamental role in the study of G-structures and Cartan's equivalence method. Torsion is also useful in the study of unparametrized families of geodesics, via the associated projective connection. In relativity theory, such ideas have been implemented in the form of Einstein–Cartan theory.

== Definition ==
Let M be a manifold with an affine connection on the tangent bundle (aka covariant derivative) ∇. The torsion tensor (sometimes called the Cartan (torsion) tensor) of ∇ is the vector-valued 2-form defined on vector fields X and Y by

$$T(X, Y) := \nabla_X Y - \nabla_Y X - [X,Y]$$

where [X, Y] is the Lie bracket of two vector fields. By the Leibniz rule, T(fX, Y) = T(X, fY) = fT(X, Y) for any smooth function f. So T is tensorial, despite being defined in terms of the connection which is a first order differential operator: it gives a 2-form on tangent vectors, while the covariant derivative is only defined for vector fields.

=== Components of the torsion tensor ===
The components of the torsion tensor $T^c{}_{ab}$ in terms of a local basis (e_{1}, ..., e_{n}) of sections of the tangent bundle can be derived by setting X = e_{i}, Y = e_{j} and by introducing the commutator coefficients γ^{k}_{ij}e_{k} := [e_{i}, e_{j}]. The components of the torsion are then

$$T^k{}_{ij} := \Gamma^k{}_{ij} - \Gamma^k{}_{ji}-\gamma^k{}_{ij},\quad i,j,k=1,2,\ldots,n.$$

Here ${\Gamma^k}_{ij}$ are the connection coefficients defining the connection. If the basis is holonomic then the Lie brackets vanish, $\gamma^k{}_{ij}=0$. So $T^k{}_{ij}=2\Gamma^k{}_{[ij]}$. In particular (see below), while the geodesic equations determine the symmetric part of the connection, the torsion tensor determines the antisymmetric part.

=== The torsion form ===
The torsion form, an alternative characterization of torsion, applies to the frame bundle FM of the manifold M. This principal bundle is equipped with a connection form ω, a gl(n)-valued one-form which maps vertical vectors to the generators of the right action in gl(n) and equivariantly intertwines the right action of GL(n) on the tangent bundle of FM with the adjoint representation on gl(n). The frame bundle also carries a canonical one-form θ, with values in R^{n}, defined at a frame u ∈ F_{x}M (regarded as a linear function u : R^{n} → T_{x}M) by

$$\theta(X) = u^{-1}(\pi_{*}(X))$$

where π : FM → M is the projection mapping for the principal bundle and π∗ is its push-forward. The torsion form is then

$$\Theta = d\theta + \omega\wedge\theta.$$

Equivalently, Θ = Dθ, where D is the exterior covariant derivative determined by the connection.

The torsion form is a (horizontal) tensorial form with values in R^{n}, meaning that under the right action of g ∈ GL(n) it transforms equivariantly:

$$R_g^*\Theta = g^{-1}\cdot\Theta$$

where $g^{-1}$ acts on the right-hand side by its canonical action on R^{n}.

==== Torsion form in a frame ====
The torsion form may be expressed in terms of a connection form on the base manifold M, written in a particular frame of the tangent bundle (e_{1}, ..., e_{n}). The connection form expresses the exterior covariant derivative of these basic sections:

$$D\mathbf{e}_i = \mathbf{e}_j {\omega^j}_i .$$

The solder form for the tangent bundle (relative to this frame) is the dual basis θ^{i} ∈ T^{∗}M of the e_{i}, so that θ^{i}(e_{j}) = δ^{i}_{j} (the Kronecker delta). Then the torsion 2-form has components

$$\Theta^k = d\theta^k + {\omega^k}_j \wedge \theta^j = {T^k}_{ij} \theta^i \wedge \theta^j.$$

In the rightmost expression,

$${T^k}_{ij} = \theta^k\left(\nabla_{\mathbf{e}_i}\mathbf{e}_j - \nabla_{\mathbf{e}_j}\mathbf{e}_i - \left[\mathbf{e}_i, \mathbf{e}_j\right]\right)$$

are the frame-components of the torsion tensor, as given in the previous definition.

It can be easily shown that Θ^{i} transforms tensorially in the sense that if a different frame

$$\tilde{\mathbf{e}}_i = \mathbf{e}_j {g^j}_i$$

for some invertible matrix-valued function (g^{j}_{i}), then

$$\tilde{\Theta}^i = {\left(g^{-1}\right)^i}_j\Theta^j.$$

In other terms, Θ is a tensor of type (1, 2) (carrying one contravariant and two covariant indices).

Alternatively, the solder form can be characterized in a frame-independent fashion as the TM-valued one-form θ on M corresponding to the identity endomorphism of the tangent bundle under the duality isomorphism End(TM) ≈ TM ⊗ T^{∗}M. Then the torsion 2-form is a section

$$\Theta\in\text{Hom}\left({\textstyle\bigwedge}^2 {\rm T}M, {\rm T}M\right)$$

given by

$$\Theta = D\theta ,$$

where D is the exterior covariant derivative. (See connection form for further details.)

=== Irreducible decomposition ===
The torsion tensor can be decomposed into two irreducible parts: a trace-free part and another part which contains the trace terms. Using the index notation, the trace of T is given by

$$a_i = T^k{}_{ik} ,$$

and the trace-free part is

$$B^i{}_{jk} = T^i{}_{jk} + \frac{1}{n-1}\delta^i{}_ja_k-\frac{1}{n-1}\delta^i{}_ka_j ,$$

where δ^{i}_{j} is the Kronecker delta.

Intrinsically, one has

$$T\in \operatorname{Hom}\left({\textstyle\bigwedge}^2 {\rm T}M, {\rm T}M\right).$$

The trace of T, tr T, is an element of T^{∗}M defined as follows. For each vector fixed X ∈ TM, T defines an element T(X) of Hom(TM, TM) via

$$T(X) : Y \mapsto T(X \wedge Y).$$

Then (tr T)(X) is defined as the trace of this endomorphism. That is,

$$(\operatorname{tr}\, T)(X) \stackrel{\text{def}}{=}\operatorname{tr} (T(X)).$$

The trace-free part of T is then

$$T_0 = T - \frac{1}{n-1}\iota(\operatorname{tr} \,T) ,$$

where ι denotes the interior product.

== Curvature and the Bianchi identities ==
The curvature tensor of ∇ is a mapping TM × TM → End(TM) defined on vector fields X, Y, and Z by

$$R(X, Y)Z = \nabla_X\nabla_YZ - \nabla_Y\nabla_XZ - \nabla_{[X, Y]}Z.$$

For vectors at a point, this definition is independent of how the vectors are extended to vector fields away from the point (thus it defines a tensor, much like the torsion).

The Bianchi identities relate the curvature and torsion as follows. Let $\mathfrak{S}$ denote the cyclic sum over X, Y, and Z. For instance,

$$\mathfrak{S}\left(R\left(X, Y\right)Z\right) := R(X, Y)Z + R(Y, Z)X + R(Z, X)Y.$$

Then the following identities hold

1. Bianchi's first identity:
  $$\mathfrak{S}\left(R\left(X, Y\right)Z\right) = \mathfrak{S}\left(T\left(T(X, Y), Z\right) + \left(\nabla_XT\right)\left(Y, Z\right)\right)$$
2. Bianchi's second identity:
  $$\mathfrak{S}\left(\left(\nabla_XR\right)\left(Y, Z\right) + R\left(T\left(X, Y\right), Z\right)\right) = 0$$

=== The curvature form and Bianchi identities ===
The curvature form is the gl(n)-valued 2-form

$$\Omega = D\omega = d\omega + \omega \wedge \omega$$

where, again, D denotes the exterior covariant derivative. In terms of the curvature form and torsion form, the corresponding Bianchi identities are

1. $D\Theta = \Omega \wedge \theta$
2. $D\Omega = 0.$

Moreover, one can recover the curvature and torsion tensors from the curvature and torsion forms as follows. At a point u of F_{x}M, one has

$$\begin{align}
R(X, Y)Z &= u\left(2\Omega\left(\pi^{-1}(X), \pi^{-1}(Y)\right)\right)\left(u^{-1}(Z)\right), \\
T(X, Y) &= u\left(2\Theta\left(\pi^{-1}(X), \pi^{-1}(Y)\right)\right),
\end{align}$$

where again u : R^{n} → T_{x}M is the function specifying the frame in the fibre, and the choice of lift of the vectors via π^{−1} is irrelevant since the curvature and torsion forms are horizontal (they vanish on the ambiguous vertical vectors).

== Characterizations and interpretations ==
The torsion is a manner of characterizing the amount of slipping or twisting that a plane does when rolling along a surface or higher dimensional affine manifold.

For example, consider rolling a plane along a small circle drawn on a sphere. If the plane does not slip or twist, then when the plane is rolled all the way along the circle, it will also trace a circle in the plane. It turns out that the plane will have rotated (despite there being no twist whilst rolling it), an effect due to the curvature of the sphere. But the curve traced out will still be a circle, and so in particular a closed curve that begins and ends at the same point. On the other hand, if the plane were rolled along the sphere, but it was allowed it to slip or twist in the process, then the path the circle traces on the plane could be a much more general curve that need not even be closed. The torsion is a way to quantify this additional slipping and twisting while rolling a plane along a curve.

Thus the torsion tensor can be intuitively understood by taking a small parallelogram circuit with sides given by vectors v and w, in a space and rolling the tangent space along each of the four sides of the parallelogram, marking the point of contact as it goes. When the circuit is completed, the marked curve will have been displaced out of the plane of the parallelogram by a vector, denoted $T(v,w)$. Thus the torsion tensor is a tensor: a (bilinear) function of two input vectors v and w that produces an output vector $T(v,w)$. It is skew symmetric in the arguments v and w, a reflection of the fact that traversing the circuit in the opposite sense undoes the original displacement, in much the same way that twisting a screw in opposite directions displaces the screw in opposite ways. The torsion tensor thus is related to, although distinct from, the torsion of a curve, as it appears in the Frenet–Serret formulas: the torsion of a connection measures a dislocation of a developed curve out of its plane, while the torsion of a curve is also a dislocation out of its osculating plane. In the geometry of surfaces, the geodesic torsion describes how a surface twists about a curve on the surface. The companion notion of curvature measures how moving frames roll along a curve without slipping or twisting.

=== Example ===
Consider the (flat) Euclidean space $M=\mathbb R^3$. On it, we put a connection that is flat, but with non-zero torsion, defined on the standard Euclidean frame $e_1,e_2,e_3$ by the (Euclidean) cross product:
$$\nabla_{e_i}e_j = e_i\times e_j.$$
Consider now the parallel transport of the vector $e_2$ along the $e_1$ axis, starting at the origin. The parallel vector field $X(x)=a(x)e_2+b(x)e_3$ thus satisfies $X(0)=e_2$, and the differential equation
$$\begin{aligned}
0=\dot X &= \nabla_{e_1}X = \dot a e_2 + \dot b e_3 + a e_1\times e_2 + b e_1\times e_3 \\
&= (\dot a - b)e_2 + (\dot b + a)e_3.
\end{aligned}$$
Thus $\dot a = b, \dot b = -a$, and the solution is $X = \cos x\,e_2 - \sin x\, e_3$.

Now the tip of the vector $X$, as it is transported along the $e_1$ axis traces out the helix
$$x\,e_1 + \cos x\,e_2 - \sin x\, e_3.$$
Thus we see that, in the presence of torsion, parallel transport tends to twist a frame around the direction of motion, analogously to the role played by torsion in the classical differential geometry of curves.

=== Development ===
One interpretation of the torsion involves the development of a curve. Suppose that a piecewise smooth closed loop $\gamma:[0,1] \to M$ is given, based at the point $p\in M$, where $\gamma(0)=\gamma(1)=p$. We assume that $\gamma$ is homotopic to zero. The curve can be developed into the tangent space at $p$ in the following manner. Let $\theta^i$ be a parallel coframe along $\gamma$, and let $x^i$ be the coordinates on $T_pM$ induced by $\theta^i(p)$. A development of $\gamma$ is a curve $\tilde\gamma$ in $T_pM$ whose coordinates $x^i=x^i(t)$ sastify the differential equation
$$dx^i = \gamma^*\theta^i.$$
If the torsion is zero, then the developed curve $\tilde\gamma$ is also a closed loop (so that $\tilde\gamma(0)=\tilde\gamma(1)$). On the other hand, if the torsion is non-zero, then the developed curve may not be closed, so that $\tilde\gamma(0)\not=\tilde\gamma(1)$. Thus the development of a loop in the presence of torsion can become dislocated, analogously to a screw dislocation.

The foregoing considerations can be made more quantitative by considering a small parallelogram, originating at the point $p\in M$, with sides $v,w\in T_pM$. Then the tangent bivector to the parallelogram is $v\wedge w\in\Lambda^2 T_pM$. The development of this parallelogram, using the connection, is no longer closed in general, and the displacement in going around the loop is translation by the vector $\Theta(v,w)$, where $\Theta$ is the torsion tensor, up to higher order terms in $v,w$. This displacement is directly analogous to the Burgers vector of crystallography.

More generally, one can also transport a moving frame along the curve $\tilde\gamma$. The linear transformation that the frame undergoes between $t=0,t=1$ is then determined by the curvature of the connection. Together, the linear transformation of the frame and the translation of the starting point from $\tilde\gamma(0)$ to $\tilde\gamma(1)$ comprise the holonomy of the connection.

=== The torsion of a filament ===
In materials science, and especially elasticity theory, ideas of torsion also play an important role. One problem models the growth of vines, focusing on the question of how vines manage to twist around objects. The vine itself is modeled as a pair of elastic filaments twisted around one another. In its energy-minimizing state, the vine naturally grows in the shape of a helix. But the vine may also be stretched out to maximize its extent (or length). In this case, the torsion of the vine is related to the torsion of the pair of filaments (or equivalently the surface torsion of the ribbon connecting the filaments), and it reflects the difference between the length-maximizing (geodesic) configuration of the vine and its energy-minimizing configuration.

=== Torsion and vorticity ===
In fluid dynamics, torsion is naturally associated to vortex lines.

Suppose that a connection $D$ is given in three dimensions, with curvature 2-form $\Omega_a^b$ and torsion 2-form $\Theta^a = D\theta^a$. Let $\eta_{abc}$ be the skew-symmetric Levi-Civita tensor, and
$$t_a = \tfrac12\eta_{abc}\wedge\Omega^{bc},$$
$$s_{ab} = -\eta_{abc}\wedge\Theta^c.$$
Then the Bianchi identities
$$D\Omega^a_b = 0,\quad D\Theta^a = \Omega^a_b\wedge\theta^b.$$
imply that $Dt_a=0$ and
$$Ds_{ab} = \theta_a\wedge t_b - \theta_b\wedge t_a.$$
These are the equations satisfied by an equilibrium continuous medium with moment density $s_{ab}$.

== Geodesics and the absorption of torsion ==
Suppose that γ(t) is a curve on M. Then γ is an affinely parametrized geodesic provided that

$$\nabla_{\dot{\gamma}(t)}\dot{\gamma}(t) = 0$$

for all time t in the domain of γ. (Here the dot denotes differentiation with respect to t, which associates with γ the tangent vector pointing along it.) Each geodesic is uniquely determined by its initial tangent vector at time t = 0, $\dot{\gamma}(0)$.

One application of the torsion of a connection involves the geodesic spray of the connection: roughly the family of all affinely parametrized geodesics. Torsion is the ambiguity of classifying connections in terms of their geodesic sprays:

- Two connections ∇ and ∇′ which have the same affinely parametrized geodesics (i.e., the same geodesic spray) differ only by torsion.

More precisely, if X and Y are a pair of tangent vectors at p ∈ M, then let

$$\Delta(X,Y)=\nabla_X\tilde{Y}-\nabla'_X\tilde{Y}$$

be the difference of the two connections, calculated in terms of arbitrary extensions of X and Y away from p. By the Leibniz product rule, one sees that Δ does not actually depend on how X and Y′ are extended (so it defines a tensor on M). Let S and A be the symmetric and alternating parts of Δ:

$$S(X,Y)=\tfrac12\left(\Delta(X,Y)+\Delta(Y,X)\right)$$
$$A(X,Y)=\tfrac12\left(\Delta(X,Y)-\Delta(Y,X)\right)$$

Then

- $A(X,Y) = \tfrac12\left(T(X,Y) - T'(X,Y)\right)$ is the difference of the torsion tensors.
- ∇ and ∇′ define the same families of affinely parametrized geodesics if and only if S(X, Y) = 0.

In other words, the symmetric part of the difference of two connections determines whether they have the same parametrized geodesics, whereas the skew part of the difference is determined by the relative torsions of the two connections. Another consequence is:

- Given any affine connection ∇, there is a unique torsion-free connection ∇′ with the same family of affinely parametrized geodesics. The difference between these two connections is in fact a tensor, the contorsion tensor.

This is a generalization of the fundamental theorem of Riemannian geometry to general affine (possibly non-metric) connections. Picking out the unique torsion-free connection subordinate to a family of parametrized geodesics is known as absorption of torsion, and it is one of the stages of Cartan's equivalence method.

== See also ==
- Contorsion tensor
- Curtright field
- Curvature tensor
- Levi-Civita connection
- Torsion coefficient
- Torsion of curves
