= G-structure on a manifold =

Structure group sub-bundle on a tangent frame bundle

In differential geometry, a G-structure on an $n$-manifold $M$, for a given structure group $G$, is a principal $G$-subbundle of the tangent frame bundle $\text{F}M$ (or $\operatorname{GL}(M)$) of $M$.

The notion of $G$-structures includes various classical structures that can be defined on manifolds, which in some cases are tensor fields. For example, for the orthogonal group, an $\operatorname{O}(n)$-structure defines a Riemannian metric, and for the special linear group an $\operatorname{SL}(n,\mathbb{R})$-structure is the same as a volume form. For the trivial group, an $\{e\}$-structure consists of an absolute parallelism of the manifold.

Generalising this idea to arbitrary principal bundles on topological spaces, one can ask if a principal $G$-bundle over a group $G$ "comes from" a subgroup $H$ of $G$. This is called reduction of the structure group (to $H$).

Several structures on manifolds, such as a complex structure, a symplectic structure, or a Kähler structure, are $G$-structures with an additional integrability condition.

== Reduction of the structure group ==
One can ask if a principal $G$-bundle over a group $G$ "comes from" a subgroup $H$ of $G$. This is called reduction of the structure group (to $H$), and makes sense for any map $H \to G$, which need not be an inclusion map (despite the terminology).

=== Definition ===
In the following, let $X$ be a topological space, $G, H$ topological groups and $\phi\colon H \to G$ a group homomorphism.

==== In terms of concrete bundles ====
Given a principal $G$-bundle $P$ over $X$, a reduction of the structure group (from $G$ to $H$) is a $H$-bundle $Q$ and an isomorphism $\phi_Q\colon Q \times_H G \to P$ of the associated bundle to the original bundle.

==== In terms of classifying spaces ====
Given a map $\pi\colon X \to BG$, where $BG$ is the classifying space for $G$-bundles, a reduction of the structure group is a map $\pi_Q\colon X \to BH$ and a homotopy $\phi_Q\colon B\phi \circ \pi_Q \to \pi$.

=== Properties and examples ===
Reductions of the structure group do not always exist. If they exist, they are usually not essentially unique, since the isomorphism $\phi$ is an important part of the data.

As a concrete example, every even-dimensional real vector space is isomorphic to the underlying real space of a complex vector space: it admits a linear complex structure. A real vector bundle admits an almost complex structure if and only if it is isomorphic to the underlying real bundle of a complex vector bundle. This is then a reduction along the inclusion GL(n,C) → GL(2n,R)

In terms of transition maps, a G-bundle can be reduced if and only if the transition maps can be taken to have values in H. Note that the term reduction is misleading: it suggests that H is a subgroup of G, which is often the case, but need not be (for example for spin structures): it's properly called a lifting.

More abstractly, "G-bundles over X" is a functor in G: Given a Lie group homomorphism H → G, one gets a map from H-bundles to G-bundles by inducing (as above). Reduction of the structure group of a G-bundle B is choosing an H-bundle whose image is B.

The inducing map from H-bundles to G-bundles is in general neither onto nor one-to-one, so the structure group cannot always be reduced, and when it can, this reduction need not be unique. For example, not every manifold is orientable, and those that are orientable admit exactly two orientations.

If H is a closed subgroup of G, then there is a natural one-to-one correspondence between reductions of a G-bundle B to H and global sections of the fiber bundle B/H obtained by quotienting B by the right action of H. Specifically, the fibration B → B/H is a principal H-bundle over B/H. If σ : X → B/H is a section, then the pullback bundle B_{H} = σ^{−1}B is a reduction of B.

== G-structures ==
Every vector bundle of dimension $n$ has a canonical $GL(n)$-bundle, the frame bundle. In particular, every smooth manifold has a canonical vector bundle, the tangent bundle. For a Lie group $G$ and a group homomorphism $\phi\colon G \to GL(n)$, a $G$-structure is a reduction of the structure group of the frame bundle to $G$.

=== Examples ===
The following examples are defined for real vector bundles, particularly the tangent bundle of a smooth manifold.

Group homomorphism	Group $G$	$G$-structure	Obstruction
$GL^+(n) < GL(n)$	General linear group of positive determinant	Orientation	Bundle must be orientable
$SL(n) < GL(n)$	Special linear group	Volume form	Bundle must be orientable ($SL \to GL^+$ is a deformation retract)
$SL^{\pm}(n) < GL(n)$	Determinant $\pm 1$	Pseudo-volume form	Always possible
$O(n) < GL(n)$	Orthogonal group	Riemannian metric	Always possible ($O(n)$ is the maximal compact subgroup, so the inclusion is a deformation retract)
$O(p,n-p) < GL(n)$	Indefinite orthogonal group	Pseudo-Riemannian metric	Topological obstruction
$GL(n,\mathbf{C}) < GL(2n,\mathbf{R})$	Complex general linear group	Almost complex structure	Topological obstruction
$GL(n,\mathbf{H})\cdot Sp(1) < GL(4n,\mathbf{R})$	$GL(n,\mathbf{H})$: quaternionic general linear group acting on $\mathbf{H}^n \cong \mathbf{R}^{4n}$ from the left; $Sp(1)=Spin(3)$: group of unit quaternions acting on $\mathbf{H}^n$ from the right	Almost quaternionic structure	Topological obstruction
$GL(k) \times GL(n-k) < GL(n)$	General linear group	Decomposition as a Whitney sum (direct sum) of sub-bundles of rank $k$ and $n-k$.	Topological obstruction

Some $G$-structures are defined in terms of others: Given a Riemannian metric on an oriented manifold, a $G$-structure for the double cover $\mbox{Spin}(n) \to \mbox{SO}(n)$ is a spin structure. (Note that the group homomorphism here is not an inclusion.)

=== Principal bundles ===
Although the theory of principal bundles plays an important role in the study of G-structures, the two notions are different. A G-structure is a principal subbundle of the tangent frame bundle, but the fact that the G-structure bundle consists of tangent frames is regarded as part of the data. For example, consider two Riemannian metrics on R^{n}. The associated O(n)-structures are isomorphic if and only if the metrics are isometric. But, since R^{n} is contractible, the underlying O(n)-bundles are always going to be isomorphic as principal bundles because the only bundles over contractible spaces are trivial bundles.

This fundamental difference between the two theories can be captured by giving an additional piece of data on the underlying G-bundle of a G-structure: the solder form. The solder form is what ties the underlying principal bundle of the G-structure to the local geometry of the manifold itself by specifying a canonical isomorphism of the tangent bundle of M to an associated vector bundle. Although the solder form is not a connection form, it can sometimes be regarded as a precursor to one.

In detail, suppose that Q is the principal bundle of a G-structure. If Q is realized as a reduction of the frame bundle of M, then the solder form is given by the pullback of the tautological form of the frame bundle along the inclusion. Abstractly, if one regards Q as a principal bundle independently of its realization as a reduction of the frame bundle, then the solder form consists of a representation ρ of G on R^{n} and an isomorphism of bundles θ : TM → Q ×_{ρ} R^{n}.

== Integrability conditions and flat G-structures ==
Several structures on manifolds, such as a complex structure, a symplectic structure, or a Kähler structure, are G-structures (and thus can be obstructed), but need to satisfy an additional integrability condition. Without the corresponding integrability condition, the structure is instead called an "almost" structure, as in an almost complex structure, an almost symplectic structure, or an almost Kähler structure.

Specifically, a symplectic manifold structure is a stronger concept than a G-structure for the symplectic group. A symplectic structure on a manifold is a 2-form ω on M that is non-degenerate (which is an $Sp$-structure, or almost symplectic structure), together with the extra condition that dω = 0; this latter is called an integrability condition.

Similarly, foliations correspond to G-structures coming from block matrices, together with integrability conditions so that the Frobenius theorem applies.

A flat G-structure is a G-structure P having a global section (V_{1},...,V_{n}) consisting of commuting vector fields. A G-structure is integrable (or locally flat) if it is locally isomorphic to a flat G-structure.

== Isomorphism of G-structures ==
The set of diffeomorphisms of M that preserve a G-structure is called the automorphism group of that structure. For an O(n)-structure they are the group of isometries of the Riemannian metric and for an SL(n,R)-structure volume preserving maps.

Let P be a G-structure on a manifold M, and Q a G-structure on a manifold N. Then an isomorphism of the G-structures is a diffeomorphism f : M → N such that the pushforward of linear frames f_{*} : FM → FN restricts to give a mapping of P into Q. (Note that it is sufficient that Q be contained within the image of f_{*}.) The G-structures P and Q are locally isomorphic if M admits a covering by open sets U and a family of diffeomorphisms f_{U} : U → f(U) ⊂ N such that f_{U} induces an isomorphism of P|_{U} → Q|_{f(U)}.

An automorphism of a G-structure is an isomorphism of a G-structure P with itself. Automorphisms arise frequently in the study of transformation groups of geometric structures, since many of the important geometric structures on a manifold can be realized as G-structures.

A wide class of equivalence problems can be formulated in the language of G-structures. For example, a pair of Riemannian manifolds are (locally) equivalent if and only if their bundles of orthonormal frames are (locally) isomorphic G-structures. In this view, the general procedure for solving an equivalence problem is to construct a system of invariants for the G-structure which are then sufficient to determine whether a pair of G-structures are locally isomorphic or not.

== Connections on G-structures ==
Let Q be a G-structure on M. A principal connection on the principal bundle Q induces a connection on any associated vector bundle: in particular on the tangent bundle. A linear connection ∇ on TM arising in this way is said to be compatible with Q. Connections compatible with Q are also called adapted connections.

Concretely speaking, adapted connections can be understood in terms of a moving frame. Suppose that V_{i} is a basis of local sections of TM (i.e., a frame on M) which defines a section of Q. Any connection ∇ determines a system of basis-dependent 1-forms ω via

∇_{X} V_{i} = ω_{i}^{j}(X)V_{j}

where, as a matrix of 1-forms, ω ∈ Ω^{1}(M)⊗gl(n). An adapted connection is one for which ω takes its values in the Lie algebra g of G.

=== Torsion of a G-structure ===
Associated to any G-structure is a notion of torsion, related to the torsion of a connection. Note that a given G-structure may admit many different compatible connections which in turn can have different torsions, but in spite of this it is possible to give an independent notion of torsion of the G-structure as follows.

The difference of two adapted connections is a 1-form on M with values in the adjoint bundle Ad_{Q}. That is to say, the space A^{Q} of adapted connections is an affine space for Ω^{1}(Ad_{Q}).

The torsion of an adapted connection defines a map

$$A^Q \to \Omega^2 (TM)\,$$

to 2-forms with coefficients in TM. This map is linear; its linearization

$$\tau:\Omega^1(\mathrm{Ad}_Q)\to \Omega^2(TM)\,$$

is called the algebraic torsion map. Given two adapted connections ∇ and ∇′, their torsion tensors T_{∇}, T_{∇′} differ by τ(∇−∇′). Therefore, the image of T_{∇} in coker(τ) is independent from the choice of ∇.

The image of T_{∇} in coker(τ) for any adapted connection ∇ is called the torsion of the G-structure. A G-structure is said to be torsion-free if its torsion vanishes. This happens precisely when Q admits a torsion-free adapted connection.

=== Example: Torsion for almost complex structures ===
An example of a G-structure is an almost complex structure, that is, a reduction of a structure group of an even-dimensional manifold to GL(n,C). Such a reduction is uniquely determined by a C^{∞}-linear endomorphism J ∈ End(TM) such that J^{2} = −1. In this situation, the torsion can be computed explicitly as follows.

An easy dimension count shows that

$$\Omega^2(TM)= \Omega^{2,0}(TM)\oplus \mathrm{im}(\tau)$$,

where Ω^{2,0}(TM) is a space of forms B ∈ Ω^{2}(TM) which satisfy

$$B(JX,Y) = B(X, JY) = - J B(X,Y).\,$$

Therefore, the torsion of an almost complex structure can be considered as an element in Ω^{2,0}(TM). It is easy to check that the torsion of an almost complex structure is equal to its Nijenhuis tensor.

== Higher order G-structures ==
Imposing integrability conditions on a particular G-structure (for instance, with the case of a symplectic form) can be dealt with via the process of prolongation. In such cases, the prolonged G-structure cannot be identified with a G-subbundle of the bundle of linear frames. In many cases, however, the prolongation is a principal bundle in its own right, and its structure group can be identified with a subgroup of a higher-order jet group. In which case, it is called a higher order G-structure [Kobayashi]. In general, Cartan's equivalence method applies to such cases.

== See also ==
- G_{2}-structure
