= Vector-valued differential form =

Concept in differential topology

In mathematics, a vector-valued differential form on a manifold M is a differential form on M with values in a vector space V. More generally, it is a differential form with values in some vector bundle E over M. Ordinary differential forms can be viewed as R-valued differential forms.

An important case of vector-valued differential forms are Lie algebra-valued forms (a connection form is an example of such a form.)

== Definition ==
Let M be a smooth manifold and E → M be a smooth vector bundle over M. We denote the space of smooth sections of a bundle E by Γ(E). An E-valued differential form of degree p is a smooth section of the tensor product bundle of E with Λ^{p}(T^{∗}M), the p-th exterior power of the cotangent bundle of M. The space of such forms is denoted by

$$\Omega^p(M,E) = \Gamma(E\otimes\Lambda^pT^*M).$$

Because Γ is a strong monoidal functor, this can also be interpreted as

$$\Gamma(E\otimes\Lambda^pT^*M) = \Gamma(E) \otimes_{\Omega^0(M)} \Gamma(\Lambda^pT^*M) = \Gamma(E) \otimes_{\Omega^0(M)} \Omega^p(M),$$

where the latter two tensor products are the tensor product of modules over the ring Ω^{0}(M) of smooth R-valued functions on M (see the seventh example here). By convention, an E-valued 0-form is just a section of the bundle E. That is,

$$\Omega^0(M,E) = \Gamma(E).\,$$

Equivalently, an E-valued differential form can be defined as a bundle morphism

$$TM\otimes\cdots\otimes TM \to E$$

which is totally skew-symmetric.

Let V be a fixed vector space. A V-valued differential form of degree p is a differential form of degree p with values in the trivial bundle M × V. The space of such forms is denoted Ω^{p}(M, V). When V = R one recovers the definition of an ordinary differential form. If V is finite-dimensional, then one can show that the natural homomorphism

$$\Omega^p(M) \otimes_\mathbb{R} V \to \Omega^p(M,V),$$

where the first tensor product is of vector spaces over R, is an isomorphism.

== Operations on vector-valued forms ==
=== Pullback ===
One can define the pullback of vector-valued forms by smooth maps just as for ordinary forms. The pullback of an E-valued form on N by a smooth map φ : M → N is an (φ*E)-valued form on M, where φ*E is the pullback bundle of E by φ.

The formula is given just as in the ordinary case. For any E-valued p-form ω on N the pullback φ*ω is given by

$$(\varphi^*\omega)_x(v_1,\cdots, v_p) = \omega_{\varphi(x)}(\mathrm d\varphi_x(v_1),\cdots,\mathrm d\varphi_x(v_p)).$$

=== Wedge product ===
Just as for ordinary differential forms, one can define a wedge product of vector-valued forms. The wedge product of an E_{1}-valued p-form with an E_{2}-valued q-form is naturally an (E_{1}⊗E_{2})-valued (p+q)-form:

$$\wedge : \Omega^p(M,E_1) \times \Omega^q(M,E_2) \to \Omega^{p+q}(M,E_1\otimes E_2).$$

The definition is just as for ordinary forms with the exception that real multiplication is replaced with the tensor product:

$$(\omega\wedge\eta)(v_1,\cdots,v_{p+q}) = \frac{1}{p! q!}\sum_{\sigma\in S_{p+q}}\sgn(\sigma)\omega(v_{\sigma(1)},\cdots,v_{\sigma(p)})\otimes \eta(v_{\sigma(p+1)},\cdots,v_{\sigma(p+q)}).$$

In particular, the wedge product of an ordinary (R-valued) p-form with an E-valued q-form is naturally an E-valued (p+q)-form (since the tensor product of E with the trivial bundle M × R is naturally isomorphic to E). In terms of local frames {e_{α}} and {l_{β}} for E_{1} and E_{2} respectively, the wedge product of an E_{1}-valued p-form ω = ω^{α} e_{α}, and an E_{2}-valued q-form η = η^{β} l_{β} is

$$\omega \wedge \eta = \sum_{\alpha, \beta} (\omega^\alpha \wedge \eta^\beta) (e_\alpha \otimes l_\beta),$$

where ω^{α} ∧ η^{β} is the ordinary wedge product of $\mathbb{R}$-valued forms. For ω ∈ Ω^{p}(M) and η ∈ Ω^{q}(M, E) one has the usual commutativity relation:

$$\omega\wedge\eta = (-1)^{pq}\eta\wedge\omega.$$

In general, the wedge product of two E-valued forms is not another E-valued form, but rather an (E⊗E)-valued form. However, if E is an algebra bundle (i.e. a bundle of algebras rather than just vector spaces) one can compose with multiplication in E to obtain an E-valued form. If E is a bundle of commutative, associative algebras then, with this modified wedge product, the set of all E-valued differential forms

$$\Omega(M,E) = \bigoplus_{p=0}^{\dim M}\Omega^p(M,E)$$

becomes a graded-commutative associative algebra. If the fibers of E are not commutative then Ω(M,E) will not be graded-commutative.

=== Exterior derivative ===
For any vector space V there is a natural exterior derivative on the space of V-valued forms. This is just the ordinary exterior derivative acting component-wise relative to any basis of V. Explicitly, if {e_{α}} is a basis for V then the differential of a V-valued p-form ω = ω^{α}e_{α} is given by

$$d\omega = (d\omega^\alpha)e_\alpha.\,$$

The exterior derivative on V-valued forms is completely characterized by the usual relations:

$$\begin{align}
&d(\omega+\eta) = d\omega + d\eta\\
&d(\omega\wedge\eta) = d\omega\wedge\eta + (-1)^p\,\omega\wedge d\eta\qquad(p=\deg\omega)\\
&d(d\omega) = 0.
\end{align}$$

More generally, the above remarks apply to E-valued forms where E is any flat vector bundle over M (i.e. a vector bundle whose transition functions are constant). The exterior derivative is defined as above on any local trivialization of E.

If E is not flat then there is no natural notion of an exterior derivative acting on E-valued forms. What is needed is a choice of connection on E. A connection on E is a linear differential operator taking sections of E to E-valued one forms:

$$\nabla : \Omega^0(M,E) \to \Omega^1(M,E).$$

If E is equipped with a connection ∇ then there is a unique covariant exterior derivative

$$d_\nabla: \Omega^p(M,E) \to \Omega^{p+1}(M,E)$$

extending ∇. The covariant exterior derivative is characterized by linearity and the equation

$$d_\nabla(\omega\wedge\eta) = d_\nabla\omega\wedge\eta + (-1)^p\,\omega\wedge d_\nabla\eta$$

where ω is a E-valued p-form and η is an ordinary q-form. In general, one need not have d_{∇}^{2} = 0. In fact, this happens if and only if the connection ∇ is flat (i.e. has vanishing curvature).

== Basic or tensorial forms on principal bundles ==
Let E → M be a smooth vector bundle of rank k over M and let π : F(E) → M be the (associated) frame bundle of E, which is a principal GL_{k}(R) bundle over M. The pullback of E by π is canonically isomorphic to F(E) ×_{ρ} R^{k} via the inverse of [u, v] →u(v), where ρ is the standard representation. Therefore, the pullback by π of an E-valued form on M determines an R^{k}-valued form on F(E). It is not hard to check that this pulled back form is right-equivariant with respect to the natural action of GL_{k}(R) on F(E) × R^{k} and vanishes on vertical vectors (tangent vectors to F(E) which lie in the kernel of dπ). Such vector-valued forms on F(E) are important enough to warrant special terminology: they are called basic or tensorial forms on F(E).

Let π : P → M be a (smooth) principal G-bundle and let V be a fixed vector space together with a representation ρ : G → GL(V). A basic or tensorial form on P of type ρ is a V-valued form ω on P that is equivariant and horizontal in the sense that

1. $(R_g)^*\omega = \rho(g^{-1})\omega\,$ for all g ∈ G, and
2. $\omega(v_1, \ldots, v_p) = 0$ whenever at least one of the v_{i} are vertical (i.e., dπ(v_{i}) = 0).

Here R_{g} denotes the right action of G on P for some g ∈ G. Note that for 0-forms the second condition is vacuously true.

Example: If ρ is the adjoint representation of G on the Lie algebra, then the connection form ω satisfies the first condition (but not the second). The associated curvature form Ω satisfies both; hence Ω is a tensorial form of adjoint type. The "difference" of two connection forms is a tensorial form.

Given P and ρ as above one can construct the associated vector bundle E = P ×_{ρ} V. Tensorial q-forms on P are in a natural one-to-one correspondence with E-valued q-forms on M. As in the case of the principal bundle F(E) above, given a q-form $\overline{\phi}$ on M with values in E, define φ on P fiberwise by, say at u,

$$\phi = u^{-1}\pi^*\overline{\phi}$$

where u is viewed as a linear isomorphism $V \overset{\simeq}\to E_{\pi(u)} = (\pi^*E)_u, v \mapsto [u, v]$. φ is then a tensorial form of type ρ. Conversely, given a tensorial form φ of type ρ, the same formula defines an E-valued form $\overline{\phi}$ on M (cf. the Chern–Weil homomorphism.) In particular, there is a natural isomorphism of vector spaces

$$\Gamma(M, E) \simeq \{ f: P \to V | f(ug) = \rho(g)^{-1}f(u) \}, \, \overline{f} \leftrightarrow f$$.

Example: Let E be the tangent bundle of M. Then identity bundle map id_{E}: E →E is an E-valued one form on M. The tautological one-form is a unique one-form on the frame bundle of E that corresponds to id_{E}. Denoted by θ, it is a tensorial form of standard type.

Now, suppose there is a connection on P so that there is an exterior covariant differentiation D on (various) vector-valued forms on P. Through the above correspondence, D also acts on E-valued forms: define ∇ by

$$\nabla \overline{\phi} = \overline{D \phi}.$$

In particular for zero-forms,

$$\nabla: \Gamma(M, E) \to \Gamma(M, T^*M \otimes E)$$.

This is exactly the covariant derivative for the connection on the vector bundle E.

== Examples ==
Siegel modular forms arise as vector-valued differential forms on Siegel modular varieties.
