= Coframe =

In mathematics, a coframe or coframe field on a smooth manifold $M$ is a system of one-forms or covectors which form a basis of the cotangent bundle at every point. In the exterior algebra of $M$, one has a natural map from $v_k:\bigoplus^kT^*M\to\bigwedge^kT^*M$, given by $v_k:(\rho_1,\ldots,\rho_k)\mapsto \rho_1\wedge\ldots\wedge\rho_k$. If $M$ is $n$ dimensional, a coframe is given by a section $\sigma$ of $\bigoplus^nT^*M$ such that $v_n\circ\sigma\neq 0$. The inverse image under $v_n$ of the complement of the zero section of $\bigwedge^nT^*M$ forms a $GL(n)$ principal bundle over $M$, which is called the coframe bundle.

== See also ==
- Frame fields in general relativity
- Moving frame
