= Cartan's equivalence method =

Differential geometry technique

In mathematics, Cartan's equivalence method is a technique in differential geometry for determining whether two geometrical structures are the same up to a diffeomorphism. For example, if M and N are two Riemannian manifolds with metrics g and h, respectively, when is there a diffeomorphism

$$\phi:M\rightarrow N$$

such that

$\phi^*h=g$?

Although the answer to this particular question was known in dimension 2 to Gauss and in higher dimensions to Christoffel and perhaps Riemann as well, Élie Cartan and his intellectual heirs developed a technique for answering similar questions for radically different geometric structures. (For example see the Cartan–Karlhede algorithm.)

Cartan successfully applied his equivalence method to many such structures, including projective structures, CR structures, and complex structures, as well as ostensibly non-geometrical structures such as the equivalence of Lagrangians and ordinary differential equations. (His techniques were later developed more fully by many others, such as D. C. Spencer and Shiing-Shen Chern.)

The equivalence method is an essentially algorithmic procedure for determining when two geometric structures are identical. For Cartan, the primary geometrical information was expressed in a coframe or collection of coframes on a differentiable manifold. See method of moving frames.

== Overview ==
Specifically, suppose that M and N are a pair of manifolds each carrying a G-structure for a structure group G. This amounts to giving a special class of coframes on M and N. Cartan's method addresses the question of whether there exists a local diffeomorphism φ:M→N under which the G-structure on N pulls back to the given G-structure on M. An equivalence problem has been "solved" if one can give a complete set of structural invariants for the G-structure: meaning that such a diffeomorphism exists if and only if all of the structural invariants agree in a suitably defined sense.

Explicitly, local systems of one-forms θ^{i} and γ^{i} are given on M and N, respectively, which span the respective cotangent bundles (i.e., are coframes). The question is whether there is a local diffeomorphism φ:M→N such that the pullback of the coframe on N satisfies

$\phi^*\gamma^i(y)=g^i_j(x)\theta^j(x),\ (g^i_j)\in G$ (1)

where the coefficient g is a function on M taking values in the Lie group G. For example, if M and N are Riemannian manifolds, then G=O(n) is the orthogonal group and θ^{i} and γ^{i} are orthonormal coframes of M and N respectively. The question of whether two Riemannian manifolds are isometric is then a question of whether there exists a diffeomorphism φ satisfying (1).

=== The first step ===
The first step in the Cartan method is to express the pullback relation (1) in as invariant a way as possible through the use of a "prolongation". The most economical way to do this is to use a G-subbundle PM of the principal bundle of linear coframes LM, although this approach can lead to unnecessary complications when performing actual calculations. In particular, later on this article uses a different approach. But for the purposes of an overview, it is convenient to stick with the principal bundle viewpoint.

=== The second step ===
The second step is to use the diffeomorphism invariance of the exterior derivative to try to isolate any other higher-order invariants of the G-structure. Basically one obtains a connection in the principal bundle PM, with some torsion. The components of the connection and of the torsion are regarded as invariants of the problem.

=== The third step ===
The third step is that if the remaining torsion coefficients are not constant in the fibres of the principal bundle PM, it is often possible (although sometimes difficult), to normalize them by setting them equal to a convenient constant value and solving these normalization equations, thereby reducing the effective dimension of the Lie group G. If this occurs, one goes back to step one, now having a Lie group of one lower dimension to work with.

=== The fourth step ===
The main purpose of the first three steps was to reduce the structure group itself as much as possible. Suppose that the equivalence problem has been through the loop enough times that no further reduction is possible. At this point, there are various possible directions in which the equivalence method leads. For most equivalence problems, there are only four cases: complete reduction, involution, prolongation, and degeneracy.

Complete reduction. Here the structure group has been reduced completely to the trivial group. The problem can now be handled by methods such as the Frobenius theorem. In other words, the algorithm has successfully terminated.

On the other hand, it is possible that the torsion coefficients are constant on the fibres of PM. Equivalently, they no longer depend on the Lie group G because there is nothing left to normalize, although there may still be some torsion. The three remaining cases assume this.

Involution. The equivalence problem is said to be involutive (or in involution) if it passes Cartan's test. This is essentially a rank condition on the connection obtained in the first three steps of the procedure. The Cartan test generalizes the Frobenius theorem on the solubility of first-order linear systems of partial differential equations. If the coframes on M and N (obtained by a thorough application of the first three steps of the algorithm) agree and satisfy the Cartan test, then the two G-structures are equivalent. (Actually, to the best of the author's knowledge, the coframes must be real analytic in order for this to hold, because the Cartan-Kähler theorem requires analyticity.)

Prolongation. This is the most intricate case. In fact there are two sub-cases. In the first sub-case, all of the torsion can be uniquely absorbed into the connection form. (Riemannian manifolds are an example, since the Levi-Civita connection absorbs all of the torsion). The connection coefficients and their invariant derivatives form a complete set of invariants of the structure, and the equivalence problem is solved. In the second subcase, however, it is either impossible to absorb all of the torsion, or there is some ambiguity (as is often the case in Gaussian elimination, for example). Here, just as in Gaussian elimination, there are additional parameters which appear in attempting to absorb the torsion. These parameters themselves turn out to be additional invariants of the problem, so the structure group G must be prolonged into a subgroup of a jet group. Once this is done, one obtains a new coframe on the prolonged space and has to return to the first step of the equivalence method. (See also prolongation of G-structures.)

Degeneracy. Because of a non-uniformity of some rank condition, the equivalence method is unsuccessful in handling this particular equivalence problem. For example, consider the equivalence problem of mapping a manifold M with a single one-form θ to another manifold with a single one-form γ such that φ*γ=θ. The zeros of these one forms, as well as the rank of their exterior derivatives at each point need to be taken into account. The equivalence method can handle such problems if all of the ranks are uniform, but it is not always suitable if the rank changes. Of course, depending on the particular application, a great deal of information can still be obtained with the equivalence method.
