= Tautological one-form =

Canonical differential form

In mathematics, the tautological one-form is a special 1-form defined on the cotangent bundle $T^{*}Q$ of a manifold $Q.$ In physics, it is used to create a correspondence between the velocity of a point in a mechanical system and its momentum, thus providing a bridge between Lagrangian mechanics and Hamiltonian mechanics (on the manifold $Q$).

The exterior derivative of this form defines a symplectic form, giving $T^{*}Q$ the structure of a symplectic manifold. The tautological one-form plays an important role in relating the formalism of Hamiltonian mechanics and Lagrangian mechanics. The tautological one-form is sometimes also called the Liouville one-form, the Poincaré one-form, the canonical one-form, or the symplectic potential. A similar object is the canonical vector field on the tangent bundle.

== Definition in coordinates ==
To define the tautological one-form, select a coordinate chart $U$ on $T^*Q$ and a canonical coordinate system on $U.$ Pick an arbitrary point $m \in T^*Q.$ By definition of cotangent bundle, $m = (q,p),$ where $q \in Q$ and $p \in T_q^*Q.$ The tautological one-form $\theta_m : T_mT^*Q \to \R$ is given by
$$\theta_m = \sum^n_{i=1} p_i \, dq^i,$$
with $n = \mathop{\text{dim}}Q$ and $(p_1, \ldots, p_n) \in U \subseteq \R^n$ being the coordinate representation of $p.$

Any coordinates on $T^*Q$ that preserve this definition, up to a total differential (exact form), may be called canonical coordinates; transformations between different canonical coordinate systems are known as canonical transformations.

The canonical symplectic form, also known as the Poincaré two-form, is given by
$$\omega = -d\theta = \sum_i dq^i \wedge dp_i$$

The extension of this concept to general fibre bundles is known as the solder form. By convention, one uses the phrase "canonical form" whenever the form has a unique, canonical definition, and one uses the term "solder form", whenever an arbitrary choice has to be made. In algebraic geometry and complex geometry the term "canonical" is discouraged, due to confusion with the canonical class, and the term "tautological" is preferred, as in tautological bundle.

== Coordinate-free definition ==
The tautological 1-form can also be defined rather abstractly as a form on phase space. Let $Q$ be a manifold and $M=T^*Q$ be the cotangent bundle or phase space. Let
$$\pi : M \to Q$$
be the canonical fiber bundle projection, and let
$$\mathrm{d} \pi : TM \to TQ$$
be the induced tangent map. Let $m$ be a point on $M.$ Since $M$ is the cotangent bundle, we can understand $m$ to be a map of the tangent space at $q=\pi(m)$:
$$m : T_qQ \to \R.$$

That is, we have that $m$ is in the fiber of $q.$ The tautological one-form $\theta_m$ at point $m$ is then defined to be
$$\theta_m = m \circ \mathrm{d}_m \pi.$$

It is a linear map
$$\theta_m : T_mM \to \R$$
and so
$$\theta : M \to T^*M.$$

=== Intuition ===
Visually, the tautological 1-form can be described as follows. Like how a vector can be pictured as an ordered pair of points, a 1-form can be pictured as an ordered pair of hyperplanes.

Consider any vector in the cotangent bundle $V \in T_\omega(T^* Q)$, where $\omega \in T^*_q Q$ is its base point (a covector), and $q \in Q$ is its base point. Then, there are 3 effects of moving infinitesimally from $\omega$ to $\omega + V \delta t$: shifting the base point $q$, rotating the hyperplane of the covector $\ker\omega$, and changing the distance separating between the hyperplane pairs. In particular, the shifting of the base point creates a vector $d\pi(V) \in T_q Q$, which can be fed into the covector.

The tautological 1-form computes $\theta(V)$ by feeding to $\omega$ the vector created by shifting the base point, and ignoring the other two effects, which cannot be fed into the covector, giving $\theta(V) = \omega(d\pi(V))$.

== Symplectic potential ==
The symplectic potential is generally defined a bit more freely, and also only defined locally: it is any one-form $\phi$ such that $\omega=-d\phi$; in effect, symplectic potentials differ from the canonical 1-form by a closed form.

== Properties ==
The tautological one-form is the unique one-form that "cancels" pullback. That is, let $\beta$ be a 1-form on $Q.$ $\beta$ is a section $\beta: Q \to T^*Q.$ For an arbitrary 1-form $\sigma$ on $T^*Q,$ the pullback of $\sigma$ by $\beta$ is, by definition, $\beta^*\sigma := \sigma \circ \beta_*.$ Here, $\beta_* : TQ\to TT^*Q$ is the pushforward of $\beta.$ Like $\beta,$ $\beta^*\sigma$ is a 1-form on $Q.$ The tautological one-form $\theta$ is the only form with the property that $\beta^*\theta = \beta,$ for every 1-form $\beta$ on $Q.$

Proof.

For a chart $(\{q^i\}^n_{i=1},U)$ on $Q$ (where $U \subseteq \R^n),$ let $\{p_i,q^i\}^n_{i=1}$ be the coordinates on $T^*Q,$ where the fiber coordinates $\{p_i\}^n_{i=1}$ are associated with the linear basis $\{dq^i\}^n_{i=1}.$ By assumption, for every ${\mathbf q}=(q^1,\ldots,q^n) \in U,$
$$\beta({\mathbf q}) = \sum^n_{i=1} \beta_i(\mathbf{q})\,dq^i,$$
or
$$\mathbf{q}=(q^1,\ldots,q^n)\ \stackrel{\beta}{\to}\ (\underbrace{q^1,\ldots,q^n}_{\mathbf{q}},\underbrace{\beta_1(\mathbf{q}),\ldots,\beta_n(\mathbf{q}}_{\mathbf{p}})).$$
It follows that
$$\beta_*\left(\frac{\partial}{\partial q^i}\Biggl|_\mathbf{q}\right) =
\frac{\partial}{\partial q^i} \Biggl|_{\beta(\mathbf{q})}
+ \sum^n_{j=1}\frac{\partial \beta_j}{\partial q^i}\Biggl|_{\mathbf{q}} \cdot \frac{\partial}{\partial p_j}\Biggl|_{\beta(\mathbf{q})}$$
which implies that
$$(\beta^*\,dq^i)\left({\partial/\partial q^j}\right)_\mathbf{q}=dq^i\left[\beta_*\left({\partial/\partial q^j}\right)_\mathbf{q}\right] =
\delta_{ij}.$$

Step 1. We have
$$\begin{align}
(\beta^*\theta)\left(\partial / \partial q^i\right)_\mathbf{q}
&= \theta\left( \beta_*\left(\partial/\partial q^i\right)_\mathbf{q}\right) = \left(\sum^{n}_{j=1}p_jdq^j\right)\left(\beta_*\left(\partial/\partial q^i\right)_\mathbf{q}\right) \\
&= \beta_i(\mathbf{q}) = \beta\left(\partial/\partial q^i\right)_\mathbf{q}.
\end{align}$$

Step 1'. For completeness, we now give a coordinate-free proof that $\beta^*\theta = \beta,$ for any 1-form $\beta.$

Observe that, intuitively speaking, for every $q \in Q$ and $p \in T^*_qQ,$ the linear map $d\pi_{(q,p)}$ in the definition of $\theta$ projects the tangent space $T_{(q,p)}T^*Q$ onto its subspace $T_qQ.$ As a consequence, for every $q \in Q$ and $v \in T_qQ,$
$$d\pi_{\beta(q)}(\beta_{*q} v) = v,$$
where $\beta_{*q}$ is the instance of $\beta_*$ at the point $q \in Q,$ that is,
$$\beta_{*q} : T_qQ \to T_{\beta(q)}T^*Q.$$
Applying the coordinate-free definition of $\theta$ to $\theta_{\beta(q)},$ obtain
$$(\beta^*\theta)_qv=\theta_{\beta(q)}(\beta_{*q}v) = \beta(q)(d\pi_{\beta(q)}(\beta_{*q} v)) = \beta(q) v.$$

Step 2. It is enough to show that $\alpha=0$ if $\beta^*\alpha = 0,$ for every one-form $\beta.$ Let
$$\alpha = \sum^n_{i=1} \alpha_{q^i}(\mathbf{p},\mathbf{q})\,dq^i + \sum^n_{i=1} \alpha_{p_i}(\mathbf{p},\mathbf{q})\,dp_i,$$
where $\alpha_{p^i},\alpha_{q^i} \in C^\infty(\R^n \times U,\R).$

Substituting $v = \left(\partial / \partial q_i\right)_{\mathbf q}$ into the identity $\alpha(\beta_*v) = 0$ obtain
$$\alpha(\partial / \partial q^i)_{\beta(\mathbf q)} + \sum^n_{j=1}(\partial \beta_j / \partial q^i)_{\mathbf{q}}\cdot \alpha(\partial / \partial p_j)_{\beta(\mathbf{q})} = 0,$$
or equivalently, for any choice of $n$ functions $p_i = \beta_i(\mathbf{q}),$
$$\alpha_{q^i}(\mathbf{p},\mathbf{q}) + \sum^n_{j=1} \partial p_j / \partial q^i \cdot \alpha_{p_j}(\mathbf{p},\mathbf{q}) = 0.$$
Let $\beta = \sum^n_{j=1} c_jdq^j,$ where $c_j=\text{const}.$ In this case, $\beta_j = c_j.$ For every $\mathbf{q} \in U$ and $c_j \in \R,$
$$\alpha_{q^i}(\mathbf{p},\mathbf{q})\bigl|_{j=1\ldots n}^{p_j=c_j} = 0.$$
This shows that $\alpha_{q^i}(\mathbf{p},\mathbf{q}) = 0$ on $\R^n \times U,$ and the identity
$$\sum^n_{j=1} \partial p_j / \partial q^i \cdot \alpha_{p_j}(\mathbf{p},\mathbf{q}) = 0$$
must hold for an arbitrary choice of functions $p_i=\beta_i(\mathbf{q}).$ If $\beta = \sum^n_{j=1}c_jq^jdq^j$ (with ${}^j$ indicating superscript) then $\beta_j = c_jq^j,$ and the identity becomes
$$\alpha_{p_i}(\mathbf{p},\mathbf{q})\bigl|_{j=1\ldots n}^{p_j=c_jq^j} = 0,$$
for every $\mathbf{q} \in U$ and $c_j \in \R.$ Since $c_j = p^j / q^j,$ we see that $\alpha_{p_i}(\mathbf{p},\mathbf{q}) = 0,$ as long as $q^j \neq 0$ for all $j.$ On the other hand, the function $\alpha_{p_i}$ is continuous, and hence $\alpha_{p_i}(\mathbf{p},\mathbf{q}) = 0$ on $\R^n \times U.$

So, by the commutation between the pull-back and the exterior derivative,
$$\beta^*\omega = -\beta^* \, d\theta = -d (\beta^*\theta) = -d\beta.$$

== Action functional ==
If $H$ is a Hamiltonian on the cotangent bundle and $X_H$ is its Hamiltonian vector field, then the corresponding action $S$ is given by
$$S = \theta(X_H).$$

In more prosaic terms, the Hamiltonian flow represents the classical trajectory of a mechanical system obeying the Hamilton-Jacobi equations of motion. The Hamiltonian flow is the integral of the Hamiltonian vector field, and so one writes, using traditional notation for action-angle variables:
$$S(E) = \sum_i \oint p_i\,dq^i$$
with the integral understood to be taken over the manifold defined by holding the energy $E$ constant: $H=E=\text{const}.$

== On Riemannian and Pseudo-Riemannian Manifolds ==
If the manifold $Q$ has a Riemannian or pseudo-Riemannian metric $g,$ then corresponding definitions can be made in terms of generalized coordinates. Specifically, if we take the metric to be a map
$$g : TQ \to T^*Q,$$
then define
$$\Theta = g^*\theta$$
and
$$\Omega = -d\Theta = g^*\omega$$

In generalized coordinates $(q^1,\ldots,q^n,\dot q^1,\ldots,\dot q^n)$ on $TQ,$ one has
$$\Theta = \sum_{ij} g_{ij} \dot q^i dq^j$$
and
$$\Omega = \sum_{ij} g_{ij} \; dq^i \wedge d\dot q^j +
\sum_{ijk} \frac{\partial g_{ij}}{\partial q^k} \;
\dot q^i\, dq^j \wedge dq^k$$

The metric allows one to define a unit-radius sphere in $T^*Q.$ The canonical one-form restricted to this sphere forms a contact structure; the contact structure may be used to generate the geodesic flow for this metric.
