= Holonomic basis =

In mathematics and mathematical physics, a coordinate basis or holonomic basis for a differentiable manifold M is a set of basis vector fields {e_{1}, ..., e_{n}} defined at every point P of a region of the manifold as

$$\mathbf{e}_{\alpha} = \lim_{\delta x^{\alpha} \to 0} \frac{\delta \mathbf{s}}{\delta x^{\alpha}} ,$$

where δs is the displacement vector between the point P and a nearby point Q whose coordinate separation from P is δx^{α} along the coordinate curve x^{α} (i.e. the curve on the manifold through P for which the local coordinate x^{α} varies and all other coordinates are constant).

It is possible to make an association between such a basis and directional derivative operators. Given a parameterized curve C on the manifold defined by x^{α}(λ) with the tangent vector u = u^{α}e_{α}, where u^{α} = dx^{α}/dλ, and a function f(x^{α}) defined in a neighbourhood of C, the variation of f along C can be written as

$$\frac{df}{d\lambda} = \frac{dx^{\alpha}}{d\lambda}\frac{\partial f}{\partial x^{\alpha}} = u^{\alpha} \frac{\partial }{\partial x^{\alpha}} f .$$

Since we have that u = u^{α}e_{α}, the identification is often made between a coordinate basis vector e_{α} and the partial derivative operator ∂/∂x^{α}, under the interpretation of vectors as operators acting on functions.

A local condition for a basis {e_{1}, ..., e_{n}} to be holonomic is that all mutual Lie derivatives vanish:

$$\left[ \mathbf{e}_{\alpha} , \mathbf{e}_{\beta} \right] = {\mathcal{L}}_{\mathbf{e}_{\alpha}} \mathbf{e}_{\beta} = 0 .$$

A basis that is not holonomic is called an anholonomic, non-holonomic or non-coordinate basis.

Given a metric tensor g on a manifold M, it is in general not possible to find a coordinate basis that is orthonormal in any open region U of M. An exception is when M is the real coordinate space R^{n} considered as a manifold with g being the Euclidean metric δ_{ij}e^{i} ⊗ e^{j} at every point.

== See also ==
- Jet bundle
- Tetrad formalism
- Ricci calculus
