= One-form =

Differential form of degree one or section of a cotangent bundle

In differential geometry, a one-form (or covector field) on a differentiable manifold is a differential form of degree one. One-forms are dual to vector fields on the same manifold, in the sense that a one-form pairs naturally with a vector field to produce a real valued function, or with a tangent vector at a point to produce a real number.

The simplest example of a one-form is the differential of a function $df$ for a smooth function $f$. The natural pairing means that if $v$ is a tangent vector at a point $p$, and $\alpha$ is a one-form, then $\alpha(v)$ is a scalar. For the differential of a function, $df(v)$ is the directional derivative, or the rate at which $f$ is changing, at $p$ and along $v$.

A one-form defines a covector, also called a linear functional, at each point on the manifold. One-forms are generally assumed to vary smoothly from point to point on the manifold, or on a region of the manifold, meaning that they produce smooth functions when paired with smooth vector fields. One-forms generate the exterior algebra of differential forms, and the differential of a function naturally extends to the exterior derivative: the exterior derivative of a one-form is a two-form, of a two-form is a three-form, and so on.

One-forms are widely used in differential geometry. Their duality with vector fields makes them suited to encode algebraic conditions on vector fields, and conditions such as integrability of systems of vector fields are often simpler to formulate in terms of one-forms, together with the exterior derivative. One forms are also used in differential geometry to encode other tensors, such as the metric tensor; a selected basis of one-forms is called a coframe, and special coframes are widely used throughout Riemannian and pseudo-Riemannian geometry.

== Definition and local coordinate description ==
Formally, a one form is a smooth section of the cotangent bundle. Equivalently, a one-form on a manifold $M$ is a smooth mapping of the total space of the tangent bundle of $M$ to $\R$ whose restriction to each fibre is a linear functional on the tangent space. Concretely, a one-form $\alpha$ on $M$ defines at each point $p\in M$ an element $\alpha_p\in T^*_pM = (T_pM)^*$, that is, a linear functional (covector) $\alpha_p: T_pM \to \mathbb{R}$ on the tangent space at $p$. The assignment $M\to T^*M,$ $p\mapsto\alpha_p$ is required to be smooth.

Often one-forms are described locally, particularly in local coordinates. In a local coordinate system, a one-form is a linear combination of the differentials of the coordinates:
$$\alpha_x = f_1(x) \, dx_1 + f_2(x) \, dx_2 + \cdots + f_n(x) \, dx_n ,$$
where the $f_i$ are smooth functions. From this perspective, a one-form has a covariant transformation law on passing from one coordinate system to another. Thus a one-form is an order 1 covariant tensor field.

== Examples ==
A simple non-trivial differential one-form is the "change in angle" form $d\theta.$ This is defined as the derivative of the angle "function" $\theta(x,y)$ (which is only defined up to an additive constant), which can be explicitly defined in terms of the atan2 function. Taking the derivative yields the following formula for the total derivative:
$$\begin{align}
d\theta
&= \partial_x\left(\operatorname{atan2}(y,x)\right) dx + \partial_y\left(\operatorname{atan2}(y,x)\right) dy \\
&= -\frac{y}{x^2 + y^2} dx + \frac{x}{x^2 + y^2} dy
\end{align}$$
While the angle "function" cannot be continuously defined on the whole plane – the function atan2 is discontinuous along the negative $x$-axis – the formula for the derivative smoothly defines a one-form everywhere except at the origin, reflecting the fact that infinitesimal (and indeed local) changes in angle can be defined everywhere except the origin. Integrating this derivative along a path gives the total change in angle over the path, and integrating over a closed loop gives the winding number times $2 \pi.$

In the language of differential geometry, this derivative is a one-form on the punctured plane. It is closed (its exterior derivative is zero) but not exact, meaning that it is not the derivative of a 0-form (that is, a function): the angle $\theta$ is not a globally defined smooth function on the entire punctured plane. In fact, this form generates the first de Rham cohomology of the punctured plane. This is the most basic example of such a form, and it is fundamental in differential geometry.

== Differential of a function ==
Let $U \subseteq \R$ be open (for example, an interval $(a, b)$), and consider a differentiable function $f: U \to \R,$ with derivative $f'.$ The differential $df$ assigns to each point $x_0\in U$ a linear map from the tangent space $T_{x_0}U$ to the real numbers. In this case, each tangent space is naturally identifiable with the real number line, and the linear map $\mathbb{R}\to\mathbb{R}$ in question is given by scaling by $f'(x_0).$ This is the simplest example of a differential (one-)form.

== Systems of one-forms ==
A system of multiple one-forms is often used to express structural information on manifolds. Systems of one-forms are often expressed as one-forms with values in a vector space. When that vector space has extra structure, such as a Lie algebra, that structural information acts as a linear approximation to a corresponding curved or deformed structure on the manifold.

The prototypical example of this application is a connection one-form. A connection one-form takes values in a Lie algebra corresponding to the infinitesimal, or linearized, structure on the manifold. For example, the Levi-Civita connection on a Riemannian manifold can be represented locally by a one-form taking values in the orthogonal Lie algebra. Writing down this local connection one-form on the manifold requires a choice of frame, or gauge. It can be made gauge invariant by lifting to the principal bundle of orthonormal frames, defining a principal connection uniquely and independently from gauge choices on a higher dimensional manifold.

== See also ==
- Differential form – Expression that may be integrated over a region
- Inner product – Vector space with generalized dot product
- Reciprocal lattice – Fourier transform of a real-space lattice, important in solid-state physics
- Tensor – Algebraic object with geometric applications
