= Cotangent bundle =

Vector bundle of cotangent spaces at every point in a manifold

In mathematics, especially differential geometry, the cotangent bundle of a smooth manifold is the vector bundle of all the cotangent spaces at every point in the manifold. It may be described also as the dual bundle to the tangent bundle. This may be generalized to categories with more structure than smooth manifolds, such as complex manifolds, or (in the form of cotangent sheaf) algebraic varieties or schemes. In the smooth case, any Riemannian metric or symplectic form gives an isomorphism between the cotangent bundle and the tangent bundle, but they are not in general isomorphic in other categories.

== Formal definition via diagonal morphism ==
There are several equivalent ways to define the cotangent bundle. One way is through a diagonal mapping $\Delta$ and germs.

Let $M$ be a smooth manifold and let $M\times M$ be the Cartesian product of $M$ with itself. The diagonal mapping $\Delta$ sends a point $p$ in $M$ to the point $(p,p)$ of $M\times M$. The image of $\Delta$ is called the diagonal. Let $\mathcal{I}$ be the sheaf of germs of smooth functions on $M\times M$ which vanish on the diagonal. Then the quotient sheaf $\mathcal{I}/\mathcal{I}^2$ consists of equivalence classes of functions which vanish on the diagonal modulo higher order terms. The cotangent sheaf is defined as the pullback of this sheaf to $M$:

$$\Gamma T^*M=\Delta^*\left(\mathcal{I}/\mathcal{I}^2\right).$$

By Taylor's theorem, this is a locally free sheaf of modules with respect to the sheaf of germs of smooth functions of $M$. Thus it defines a vector bundle on $M$: the cotangent bundle.

Smooth sections of the cotangent bundle are called (differential) one-forms.

== Contravariance properties ==
A smooth morphism $\phi\colon M\to N$ of manifolds induces a pullback sheaf $\phi^*T^*N$ on M. There is an induced map of vector bundles $\phi^*(T^*N)\to T^*M$.

== Examples ==
The tangent bundle of the vector space $\mathbb{R}^n$ is $T\,\mathbb{R}^n = \mathbb{R}^n\times \mathbb{R}^n$, and the cotangent bundle is $T^*\mathbb{R}^n = \mathbb{R}^n\times (\mathbb{R}^n)^*$, where $(\mathbb{R}^n)^*$ denotes the dual space of covectors, linear functions $v^*:\mathbb{R}^n\to \mathbb{R}$.

Given a smooth manifold $M\subset \mathbb{R}^n$ embedded as a hypersurface represented by the vanishing locus of a function $f\in C^\infty (\mathbb{R}^n),$ with the condition that $\nabla f \neq 0,$ the tangent bundle is

$$TM = \{(x,v) \in T\,\mathbb{R}^n \ :\ f(x) = 0,\ \, df_x(v) = 0\},$$

where $df_x \in T^*_xM$ is the directional derivative $df_x(v) = \nabla\! f(x)\cdot v$. By definition, the cotangent bundle in this case is

$$T^*M = \bigl\{(x,v^*)\in T^*\mathbb{R}^n \ :\ f(x)=0,\ v^* \in T^*_xM \bigr\},$$

where $T^*_xM=\{v \in T_x\mathbb{R}^n\ :\ df_x(v)=0\}^*.$ Since every covector $v^* \in T^*_xM$ corresponds to a unique vector $v \in T_xM$ for which $v^*(u) = v \cdot u,$ for an arbitrary $u \in T_xM,$

$$T^*M = \bigl\{(x,v^*)\in T^*\mathbb{R}^n\ :\ f(x) = 0,\ v \in T_x\mathbb{R}^n,\ df_x(v)=0 \bigr\}.$$

== The cotangent bundle as phase space ==
Since the cotangent bundle $X=T^*M$ is a vector bundle, it can be regarded as a manifold in its own right. Because at each point the tangent directions of $M$ can be paired with their dual covectors in the fiber, $X$ possesses a canonical one-form $\theta$ called the tautological one-form, discussed below. The exterior derivative of $\theta$ is a symplectic 2-form, out of which a non-degenerate volume form can be built for $X$. For example, as a result $X$ is always an orientable manifold (the tangent bundle $TX$ is an orientable vector bundle). A special set of coordinates can be defined on the cotangent bundle; these are called the canonical coordinates. Because cotangent bundles can be thought of as symplectic manifolds, any real function on the cotangent bundle can be interpreted to be a Hamiltonian; thus the cotangent bundle can be understood to be a phase space on which Hamiltonian mechanics plays out.

=== The tautological one-form ===
The cotangent bundle carries a canonical one-form $\theta$ also known as the symplectic potential, Poincaré 1-form, or Liouville 1-form. This means that if we regard $T^*M$ as a manifold in its own right, there is a canonical section of the vector bundle $T^*(T^*M)$ over $T^*M$.

This section can be constructed in several ways. The most elementary method uses local coordinates. Suppose that $x^i$ are local coordinates on the base manifold $M$. In terms of these base coordinates, there are fibre coordinates $p_i$: a one-form at a particular point of $T^*M$ has the form $p_i\text{d}x^i$ (Einstein summation convention implied). So the manifold $T^*M$ itself carries local coordinates $(x^i,p_i)$ where the $x$'s are coordinates on the base and the $p$'s are coordinates in the fibre. The canonical one-form is given in these coordinates by
$$\theta_{(x,p)}=\sum_{i=1}^n p_i \, dx^i.$$

Intrinsically, the value of the canonical one-form in each fixed point of $T^*M$ is given as a pullback. Specifically, suppose that $\pi:T^*M\rightarrow M$ is the projection of the bundle. Taking a point in $T^*_xM$ is the same as choosing of a point $x$ in $M$ and a one-form $\omega$ at $x$, and the tautological one-form $\theta$ assigns to the point $(x,\omega)$ the value
$$\theta_{(x,\omega)}=\pi^*\omega.$$

That is, for a vector $v$ in the tangent bundle of the cotangent bundle, the application of the tautological one-form $\theta$ to $v$ at $(x,\omega)$ is computed by projecting $v$ into the tangent bundle at $x$ using $\text{d}\pi:T(T^*M)\rightarrow TM$ and applying $\omega$ to this projection. Note that the tautological one-form is not a pullback of a one-form on the base $M$.

=== Symplectic form ===
The cotangent bundle has a canonical symplectic 2-form on it, as an exterior derivative of the tautological one-form, the symplectic potential. Proving that this form is, indeed, symplectic can be done by noting that being symplectic is a local property: since the cotangent bundle is locally trivial, this definition need only be checked on $\mathbb{R}^n \times \mathbb{R}^n$. But there the one form defined is the sum of $y_i\,dx_i$, and the differential is the canonical symplectic form, the sum of $dy_i \land dx_i$.

=== Phase space ===
If the manifold $M$ represents the set of possible positions in a dynamical system, then the cotangent bundle $T^{*}\!M$ can be thought of as the set of possible positions and momenta. For example, this is a way to describe the phase space of a pendulum. The state of the pendulum is determined by its position (an angle) and its momentum (or equivalently, its velocity, since its mass is constant). The entire state space looks like a cylinder, which is the cotangent bundle of the circle. The above symplectic construction, along with an appropriate energy function, gives a complete determination of the physics of system. See Hamiltonian mechanics and the article on geodesic flow for an explicit construction of the Hamiltonian equations of motion.

== See also ==
- Legendre transformation
