= Pushforward (differential) =

Linear approximation of smooth maps on tangent spaces

If a map φ carries every point on manifold M to a point in manifold N, then the pushforward of φ carries every vector in the tangent space at a point in M to a vector in the tangent space at the corresponding point in N.

In differential geometry, pushforward is a linear approximation of smooth maps (formulating manifold) on tangent spaces. Suppose that $\varphi\colon M\to N$ is a smooth map between smooth manifolds; then the differential of $\varphi$ at a point $x$, denoted $\mathrm d\varphi_x$, is, in some sense, the best linear approximation of $\varphi$ near $x$. It can be viewed as a generalization of the total derivative of ordinary calculus. Explicitly, the differential is a linear map from the tangent space of $M$ at $x$ to the tangent space of $N$ at $\varphi(x)$, $\mathrm d\varphi_x\colon T_xM \to T_{\varphi(x)}N$. Hence it can be used to push tangent vectors on $M$ forward to tangent vectors on $N$. The differential of a map $\varphi$ is also called, by various authors, the derivative or total derivative of $\varphi$.

== Motivation ==
Let $\varphi: U \to V$ be a smooth map from an open subset $U$ of $\R^m$ to an open subset $V$ of $\R^n$. For any point $x$ in $U$, the Jacobian of $\varphi$ at $x$ (with respect to the standard coordinates) is the matrix representation of the total derivative of $\varphi$ at $x$, which is a linear map

$$d\varphi_x:T_x\R^m\to T_{\varphi(x)}\R^n$$

between their tangent spaces. Note the tangent spaces $T_x\R^m,T_{\varphi(x)}\R^n$ are isomorphic to $\mathbb{R}^m$ and $\mathbb{R}^n$, respectively. The pushforward generalizes this construction to the case that $\varphi$ is a smooth function between any smooth manifolds $M$ and $N$.

== The differential of a smooth map ==
Let $\varphi \colon M \to N$ be a smooth map of smooth manifolds. Given $x \in M,$ the differential of $\varphi$ at $x$ is a linear map

$$d\varphi_x \colon\ T_xM\to T_{\varphi(x)}N\,$$

from the tangent space of $M$ at $x$ to the tangent space of $N$ at $\varphi(x).$ The image $d\varphi_x X$ of a tangent vector $X \in T_x M$ under $d\varphi_x$ is sometimes called the pushforward of $X$ by $\varphi.$ The exact definition of this pushforward depends on the definition one uses for tangent vectors (for the various definitions see tangent space).

If tangent vectors are defined as equivalence classes of the curves $\gamma$ for which $\gamma(0) = x,$ then the differential is given by

$$d\varphi_x(\gamma'(0)) = (\varphi \circ \gamma)'(0).$$

Here, $\gamma$ is a curve in $M$ with $\gamma(0) = x,$ and $\gamma'(0)$ is the tangent vector to the curve $\gamma$ at $0.$ In other words, the pushforward of the tangent vector to the curve $\gamma$ at $0$ is the tangent vector to the curve $\varphi \circ \gamma$ at $0.$

Alternatively, if tangent vectors are defined as derivations acting on smooth real-valued functions, then the differential is given by

$$d\varphi_x(X)(f) = X(f \circ \varphi),$$

for an arbitrary function $f \in C^\infty(N)$ and an arbitrary derivation $X \in T_xM$ at point $x \in M$ (a derivation is defined as a linear map $X \colon C^\infty(M) \to \R$ that satisfies the Leibniz rule, see: definition of tangent space via derivations). By definition, the pushforward of $X$ is in $T_{\varphi(x)}N$ and therefore itself is a derivation, $d\varphi_x(X) \colon C^\infty(N) \to \R$.

After choosing two charts around $x$ and around $\varphi(x),$ $\varphi$ is locally determined by a smooth map $\widehat{\varphi} \colon U \to V$ between open sets of $\R^m$ and $\R^n$, and

$$d\varphi_x\left(\frac{\partial}{\partial u^a}\right)  = \frac{\partial{\widehat{\varphi}}^b}{\partial u^a} \frac{\partial}{\partial v^b},$$

in the Einstein summation notation, where the partial derivatives are evaluated at the point in $U$ corresponding to $x$ in the given chart.

Extending by linearity gives the following matrix

$$\left(d\varphi_x\right)_a^{\;b} = \frac{\partial{\widehat{\varphi}}^b}{\partial u^a}.$$

Thus the differential is a linear transformation, between tangent spaces, associated to the smooth map $\varphi$ at each point. Therefore, in some chosen local coordinates, it is represented by the Jacobian matrix of the corresponding smooth map from $\R^m$ to $\R^n$. In general, the differential need not be invertible. However, if $\varphi$ is a local diffeomorphism, then $d\varphi_x$ is invertible, and the inverse gives the pullback of $T_{\varphi(x)} N.$

The differential is frequently expressed using a variety of other notations such as

$$D\varphi_x,\left(\varphi_*\right)_x, \varphi'(x),T_x\varphi.$$

It follows from the definition that the differential of a composite is the composite of the differentials (i.e., functorial behaviour). This is the chain rule for smooth maps.

Also, the differential of a local diffeomorphism is a linear isomorphism of tangent spaces.

== The differential on the tangent bundle ==
The differential of a smooth map $\varphi$ induces, in an obvious manner, a bundle map (in fact a vector bundle homomorphism) from the tangent bundle of $M$ to the tangent bundle of $N$, denoted by $\operatorname{d}\!\varphi$, which fits into the following commutative diagram:

where $\pi_M$ and $\pi_N$ denote the bundle projections of the tangent bundles of $M$ and $N$ respectively.

$\operatorname{d}\!\varphi$ induces a bundle map from $TM$ to the pullback bundle $\varphi^* TN$ over $M$ via

$$v \mapsto \operatorname{d}\!\varphi_m (v),$$

where $m \in M$ and $v \in T_m M.$ The latter map may in turn be viewed as a section of the vector bundle Hom(TM, $\varphi^*TN$) over M. The bundle map $\operatorname{d}\!\varphi$ is also denoted by $T\varphi$ and called the tangent map. In this way, $T$ is a functor.

== Pushforward of vector fields ==
Given a smooth map φ : M → N and a vector field X on M, it is not usually possible to identify a pushforward of X by φ with some vector field Y on N. For example, if the map φ is not surjective, there is no natural way to define such a pushforward outside of the image of φ. Also, if φ is not injective there may be more than one choice of pushforward at a given point. Nevertheless, one can make this difficulty precise, using the notion of a vector field along a map.

A section of φ^{∗}TN over M is called a vector field along φ. For example, if M is a submanifold of N and φ is the inclusion, then a vector field along φ is just a section of the tangent bundle of N along M; in particular, a vector field on M defines such a section via the inclusion of TM inside TN. This idea generalizes to arbitrary smooth maps.

Suppose that X is a vector field on M, i.e., a section of TM. Then, $\operatorname{d}\!\varphi \circ X$ yields, in the above sense, the pushforward φ_{∗}X, which is a vector field along φ, i.e., a section of φ^{∗}TN over M.

Any vector field Y on N defines a pullback section φ^{∗}Y of φ^{∗}TN with (φ^{∗}Y)_{x} = Y_{φ(x)}. A vector field X on M and a vector field Y on N are said to be φ-related if φ_{∗}X = φ^{∗}Y as vector fields along φ. In other words, for all x in M, dφ_{x}(X) = Y_{φ(x)}.

In some situations, given a X vector field on M, there is a unique vector field Y on N which is φ-related to X. This is true in particular when φ is a diffeomorphism. In this case, the pushforward defines a vector field Y on N, given by

$$Y_y = \varphi_*\left(X_{\varphi^{-1}(y)}\right).$$

A more general situation arises when φ is surjective (for example the bundle projection of a fiber bundle). Then a vector field X on M is said to be projectable if for all y in N, dφ_{x}(X_{x}) is independent of the choice of x in φ^{−1}({y}). This is precisely the condition that guarantees that a pushforward of X, as a vector field on N, is well defined.

=== Examples ===
==== Pushforward from multiplication on Lie groups ====
Given a Lie group $G$, we can use the multiplication map $m(-,-) : G\times G \to G$ to get left multiplication $L_g = m(g,-)$ and right multiplication $R_g = m(-,g)$ maps $G \to G$. These maps can be used to construct left or right invariant vector fields on $G$ from its tangent space at the origin $\mathfrak{g} = T_e G$ (which is its associated Lie algebra). For example, given $X \in \mathfrak{g}$ we get an associated vector field $\mathfrak{X}$ on $G$ defined by
$$\mathfrak{X}_g = (L_g)_*(X) \in T_g G$$
for every $g \in G$. This can be readily computed using the curves definition of pushforward maps. In the following, we suppose we are working with a matrix Lie group. Then, if we have a curve
$$\gamma: (-1,1) \to G$$
where
$$\gamma(0) = e \, , \quad \gamma'(0) = X$$
we get
$$\begin{align}
(L_g)_*(X) &= (L_g\circ \gamma)'(0) \\
&= (g\cdot \gamma(t))'(0) \\
&= \frac{dg}{dt}\gamma(0) + g\cdot \frac{d\gamma}{dt} (0) \\
&= g \cdot \gamma'(0)
\end{align}$$
since $L_g$ is constant with respect to $\gamma$. This implies we can interpret the tangent spaces $T_g G$ as $T_g G = g\cdot T_e G = g\cdot \mathfrak{g}$.

==== Pushforward for some Lie groups ====
For example, if $G$ is the Heisenberg group given by matrices
$$H = \left\{
\begin{bmatrix}
1 & a & b \\
0 & 1 & c \\
0 & 0 & 1
\end{bmatrix} : a,b,c \in \mathbb{R}
\right\}$$
it has Lie algebra given by the set of matrices
$$\mathfrak{h} = \left\{
\begin{bmatrix}
0 & a & b \\
0 & 0 & c \\
0 & 0 & 0
\end{bmatrix} : a,b,c \in \mathbb{R}
\right\}$$
since we can find a path $\gamma:(-1,1) \to H$ giving any real number in one of the upper matrix entries with $i < j$ (i-th row and j-th column). Then, for
$$g = \begin{bmatrix}
1 & 2 & 3 \\
0 & 1 & 4 \\
0 & 0 & 1
\end{bmatrix}$$
we have
$$T_gH = g\cdot \mathfrak{h} =
\left\{
\begin{bmatrix}
0 & a & b + 2c \\
0 & 0 & c \\
0 & 0 & 0
\end{bmatrix} : a,b,c \in \mathbb{R}
\right\}$$
which is equal to the original set of matrices. This is not always the case, for example, in the group
$$G = \left\{
\begin{bmatrix}
a & b \\
0 & 1/a
\end{bmatrix} : a,b \in \mathbb{R}, a \neq 0
\right\}$$
we have its Lie algebra as the set of matrices
$$\mathfrak{g} = \left\{
\begin{bmatrix}
a & b \\
0 & -a
\end{bmatrix} : a,b \in \mathbb{R}
\right\}$$
hence for some matrix
$$g = \begin{bmatrix}
2 & 3 \\
0 & 1/2
\end{bmatrix}$$
we have
$$T_gG = \left\{
\begin{bmatrix}
2a & 2b - 3a \\
0 & -a/2
\end{bmatrix} : a,b\in \mathbb{R}
\right\}$$
which is not the same set of matrices.

== See also ==
- Pullback (differential geometry)
- Flow-based generative model
