= Frame bundle =

Principal bundle associated to a vector bundle

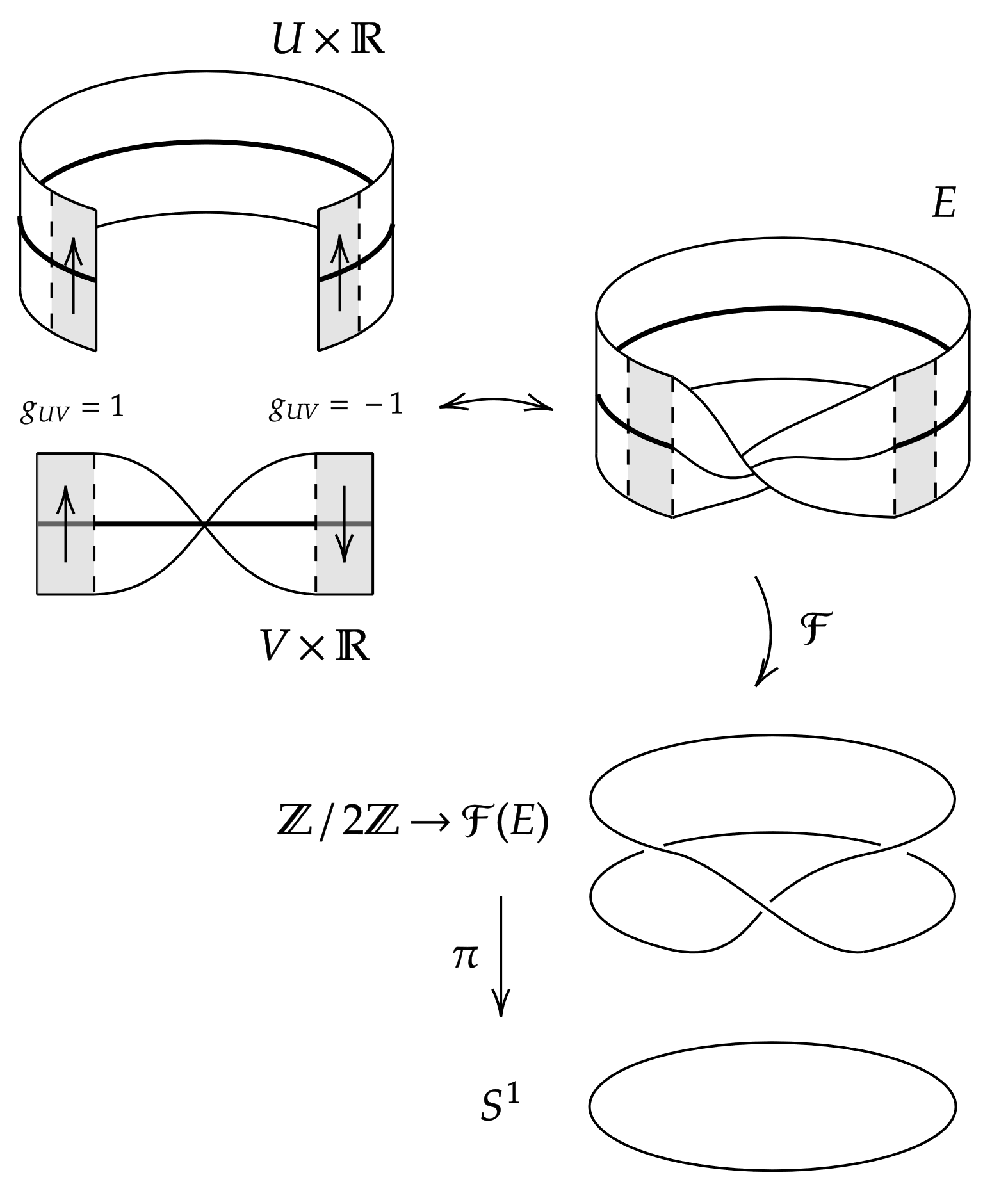
The orthonormal frame bundle $\mathcal{F_O}(E)$ of the Möbius strip $E$ is a non-trivial principal $\mathbb{Z}/2\mathbb{Z}$-bundle over the circle.

In mathematics, a frame bundle is a principal fiber bundle $F(E)$ associated with any vector bundle $E$. The fiber of $F(E)$ over a point $x$ is the set of all ordered bases, or frames, for $E_x$. The general linear group acts naturally on $F(E)$ via a change of basis, giving the frame bundle the structure of a principal $\mathrm{GL}(k,\mathbb{R})$-bundle (where k is the rank of $E$).

The frame bundle of a smooth manifold is the one associated with its tangent bundle. For this reason it is sometimes called the tangent frame bundle.

== Definition and construction ==
Let $E \to X$ be a real vector bundle of rank $k$ over a topological space $X$. A frame at a point $x \in X$ is an ordered basis for the vector space $E_x$. Equivalently, a frame can be viewed as a linear isomorphism

$$p : \mathbf{R}^k \to E_x.$$

The set of all frames at $x$, denoted $F_x$, has a natural right action by the general linear group $\mathrm{GL}(k,\mathbb{R})$ of invertible $k \times k$ matrices: a group element $g \in \mathrm{GL}(k,\mathbb{R})$ acts on the frame $p$ via composition to give a new frame

$$p\circ g:\mathbf{R}^k\to E_x.$$

This action of $\mathrm{GL}(k,\mathbb{R})$ on $F_x$ is both free and transitive (this follows from the standard linear algebra result that there is a unique invertible linear transformation sending one basis onto another). As a topological space, $F_x$ is homeomorphic to $\mathrm{GL}(k,\mathbb{R})$ although it lacks a group structure, since there is no "preferred frame". The space $F_x$ is said to be a $\mathrm{GL}(k,\mathbb{R})$-torsor.

The frame bundle of $E$, denoted by $F(E)$ or $F_{\mathrm{GL}}(E)$, is the disjoint union of all the $F_x$:

$$\mathrm F(E) = \coprod_{x\in X}F_x.$$

Each point in $F(E)$ is a pair $(x,p)$, where $x$ is a point in $X$ and $p$ is a frame at $x$. There is a natural projection $\pi: F(E)\to X$ which sends $(x,p)$ to $x$. The group $\mathrm{GL}(k,\mathbb{R})$ acts on $F(E)$ on the right as above. This action is clearly free and the orbits are just the fibers of $\pi$.

=== Principal bundle structure ===
The frame bundle $F(E)$ can be given a natural topology and bundle structure determined by that of $E$. Let $(U_i,\phi_i)$ be a local trivialization of $E$. Then for each $x \in U_i$ one has a linear isomorphism $\phi_{i,x}: E_x \to \mathbb{R}^k$. This data determines a bijection

$$\psi_i : \pi^{-1}(U_i)\to U_i\times \mathrm{GL}(k, \mathbb{R})$$

given by

$$\psi_i(x,p) = (x,\phi_{i,x}\circ p).$$

With these bijections, each $\pi^{-1}(U_i)$ can be given the topology of $U_i \times \mathrm{GL}(k,\mathbb{R})$. The topology on $F(E)$ is the final topology coinduced by the inclusion maps $\pi^{-1}(U_i) \to F(E)$.

With all of the above data the frame bundle $F(E)$ becomes a principal fiber bundle over $X$ with structure group $\mathrm{GL}(k,\mathbb{R})$ and local trivializations $(\{U_i\},\{\psi_i\})$. One can check that the transition functions of $F(E)$ are the same as those of $E$.

The above all works in the smooth category as well: if $E$ is a smooth vector bundle over a smooth manifold $M$ then the frame bundle of $E$ can be given the structure of a smooth principal bundle over $M$.

== Associated vector bundles ==
A vector bundle $E$ and its frame bundle $F(E)$ are associated bundles. Each one determines the other. The frame bundle $F(E)$ can be constructed from $E$ as above, or more abstractly using the fiber bundle construction theorem. With the latter method, $F(E)$ is the fiber bundle with same base, structure group, trivializing neighborhoods, and transition functions as $E$ but with abstract fiber $\mathrm{GL}(k,\mathbb{R})$, where the action of structure group $\mathrm{GL}(k,\mathbb{R})$ on the fiber $\mathrm{GL}(k,\mathbb{R})$ is that of left multiplication.

Given any linear representation $\rho: \mathrm{GL}(k,\mathbb{R}) \to \mathrm{GL}(V,\mathbb{F})$ there is a vector bundle

$$\mathrm F(E)\times_{\rho}V$$

associated with $F(E)$ which is given by product $F(E) \times V$ modulo the equivalence relation $(pg,v) \sim (p, \rho(g)v)$ for all $g$ in $\mathrm{GL}(k,\mathbb{R})$. Denote the equivalence classes by $[p,v]$.

The vector bundle $E$ is naturally isomorphic to the bundle $F(E) \times_\rho \mathbb{R}^k$ where $\rho$ is the defining representation of $\mathrm{GL}(k,\mathbb{R})$ on $\mathbb{R}^k$. The isomorphism is given by

$$[p,v]\mapsto p(v)$$

where $v$ is a vector in $\mathbb{R}^k$ and $p: \mathbb{R}^k \to E_x$ is a frame at $x$. One can easily check that this map is well-defined.

Any vector bundle associated with $E$ can be given by the above construction. For example, the dual bundle of $E$ is given by $F(E) \times_{\rho^*} (\mathbb{R}^k)^*$ where $\rho^*$ is the dual of the fundamental representation. Tensor bundles of $E$ can be constructed in a similar manner.

== Tangent frame bundle ==
The tangent frame bundle (or simply the frame bundle) of a smooth manifold $M$ is the frame bundle associated with the tangent bundle of $M$. The frame bundle of $M$ is often denoted $FM$ or $\mathrm{GL}(M)$ rather than $F(TM)$. In physics, it is sometimes denoted $LM$. If $M$ is $n$-dimensional then the tangent bundle has rank $n$, so the frame bundle of $M$ is a principal $\mathrm{GL}(n,\mathbb{R})$ bundle over $M$.

=== Smooth frames ===
Local sections of the frame bundle of $M$ are called smooth frames on $M$. The cross-section theorem for principal bundles states that the frame bundle is trivial over any open set in $U$ in $M$ which admits a smooth frame. Given a smooth frame $s: U \to FU$, the trivialization $\psi: FU \to U \times \mathrm{GL}(n,\mathbb{R})$ is given by

$$\psi(p) = (x, s(x)^{-1}\circ p)$$

where $p$ is a frame at $x$. It follows that a manifold is parallelizable if and only if the frame bundle of $M$ admits a global section.

Since the tangent bundle of $M$ is trivializable over coordinate neighborhoods of $M$ so is the frame bundle. In fact, given any coordinate neighborhood $U$ with coordinates $(x^1,\ldots,x^n)$ the coordinate vector fields

$$\left(\frac{\partial}{\partial x^1},\ldots,\frac{\partial}{\partial x^n}\right)$$

define a smooth frame on $U$. One of the advantages of working with frame bundles is that they allow one to work with frames other than coordinates frames; one can choose a frame adapted to the problem at hand. This is sometimes called the method of moving frames.

=== Solder form ===
The frame bundle of a manifold $M$ is a special type of principal bundle in the sense that its geometry is fundamentally tied to the geometry of $M$. This relationship can be expressed by means of a vector-valued 1-form on $FM$ called the solder form (also known as the fundamental or tautological 1-form). Let $x$ be a point of the manifold $M$ and $p$ a frame at $x$, so that

$$p : \mathbf{R}^n\to T_xM$$

is a linear isomorphism of $\mathbb{R}^n$ with the tangent space of $M$ at $x$. The solder form of $FM$ is the $\mathbb{R}^n$-valued 1-form $\theta$ defined by

$$\theta_p(\xi) = p^{-1}\mathrm d\pi(\xi)$$

where ξ is a tangent vector to $FM$ at the point $(x,p)$, and $p^{-1}: T_x M \to \mathbb{R}^n$ is the inverse of the frame map, and $d\pi$ is the differential of the projection map $\pi: FM \to M$. The solder form is horizontal in the sense that it vanishes on vectors tangent to the fibers of $\pi$ and right equivariant in the sense that

$$R_g^*\theta = g^{-1}\theta$$

where $R_g$ is right translation by $g \in \mathrm{GL}(n,\mathbb{R})$. A form with these properties is called a basic or tensorial form on $FM$. Such forms are in 1-1 correspondence with $TM$-valued 1-forms on $M$ which are, in turn, in 1-1 correspondence with smooth bundle maps $TM \to TM$ over $M$. Viewed in this light $\theta$ is just the identity map on $TM$.

As a naming convention, the term "tautological one-form" is usually reserved for the case where the form has a canonical definition, as it does here, while "solder form" is more appropriate for those cases where the form is not canonically defined. This convention is not being observed here.

== Orthonormal frame bundle ==
If a vector bundle $E$ is equipped with a Riemannian bundle metric then each fiber $E_x$ is not only a vector space but an inner product space. It is then possible to talk about the set of all orthonormal frames for $E_x$. An orthonormal frame for $E_x$ is an ordered orthonormal basis for $E_x$, or, equivalently, a linear isometry

$$p:\mathbb{R}^k \to E_x$$

where $\mathbb{R}^k$ is equipped with the standard Euclidean metric. The orthogonal group $\mathrm{O}(k)$ acts freely and transitively on the set of all orthonormal frames via right composition. In other words, the set of all orthonormal frames is a right $\mathrm{O}(k)$-torsor.

The orthonormal frame bundle of $E$, denoted $F_{\mathrm{O}}(E)$, is the set of all orthonormal frames at each point $x$ in the base space $X$. It can be constructed by a method entirely analogous to that of the ordinary frame bundle. The orthonormal frame bundle of a rank $k$ Riemannian vector bundle $E \to X$ is a principal $\mathrm{O}(k)$-bundle over $X$. Again, the construction works just as well in the smooth category.

If the vector bundle $E$ is orientable then one can define the oriented orthonormal frame bundle of $E$, denoted $F_{\mathrm{SO}}(E)$, as the principal $\mathrm{SO}(k)$-bundle of all positively oriented orthonormal frames.

If $M$ is an $n$-dimensional Riemannian manifold, then the orthonormal frame bundle of $M$, denoted $F_{\mathrm{O}}(M)$ or $\mathrm{O} (M)$, is the orthonormal frame bundle associated with the tangent bundle of $M$ (which is equipped with a Riemannian metric by definition). If $M$ is orientable, then one also has the oriented orthonormal frame bundle $F_{\mathrm{SO}}(M)$.

Given a Riemannian vector bundle $E$, the orthonormal frame bundle is a principal $\mathrm{O}(k)$-subbundle of the general linear frame bundle. In other words, the inclusion map

$$i:{\mathrm F}_{\mathrm O}(E) \to {\mathrm F}_{\mathrm{GL}}(E)$$

is principal bundle map. One says that $F_{\mathrm{O}}(E)$ is a reduction of the structure group of $F_{\mathrm{GL}}(E)$ from $\mathrm{GL}(n,\mathbb{R})$ to $\mathrm{O}(k)$.

== G-structures ==
If a smooth manifold $M$ comes with additional structure it is often natural to consider a subbundle of the full frame bundle of $M$ which is adapted to the given structure. For example, if $M$ is a Riemannian manifold we saw above that it is natural to consider the orthonormal frame bundle of $M$. The orthonormal frame bundle is just a reduction of the structure group of $F_{\mathrm{GL}}(M)$ to the orthogonal group $\mathrm{O}(n)$.

In general, if $M$ is a smooth $n$-manifold and $G$ is a Lie subgroup of $\mathrm{GL}(n,\mathbb{R})$ we define a G-structure on $M$ to be a reduction of the structure group of $F_{\mathrm{GL}}(M)$ to $G$. Explicitly, this is a principal $G$-bundle $F_{G}(M)$ over $M$ together with a $G$-equivariant bundle map

$${\mathrm F}_{G}(M) \to {\mathrm F}_{\mathrm{GL}}(M)$$

over $M$.

In this language, a Riemannian metric on $M$ gives rise to an $\mathrm{O}(n)$-structure on $M$. The following are some other examples.

- Every oriented manifold has an oriented frame bundle which is just a $\mathrm{GL}^+(n,\mathbb{R})$-structure on $M$.
- A volume form on $M$ determines a $\mathrm{SL}(n,\mathbb{R})$-structure on $M$.
- A $2n$-dimensional symplectic manifold has a natural $\mathrm{Sp}(2n,\mathbb{R})$-structure.
- A $2n$-dimensional complex or almost complex manifold has a natural $\mathrm{GL}(n,\mathbb{C})$-structure.

In many of these instances, a $G$-structure on $M$ uniquely determines the corresponding structure on $M$. For example, a $\mathrm{SL}(n,\mathbb{R})$-structure on $M$ determines a volume form on $M$. However, in some cases, such as for symplectic and complex manifolds, an added integrability condition is needed. A $\mathrm{Sp}(2n,\mathbb{R})$-structure on $M$ uniquely determines a nondegenerate 2-form on $M$, but for $M$ to be symplectic, this 2-form must also be closed.
