= Fiber bundle construction theorem =

Constructs a fiber bundle from a base space, fiber and a set of transition functions

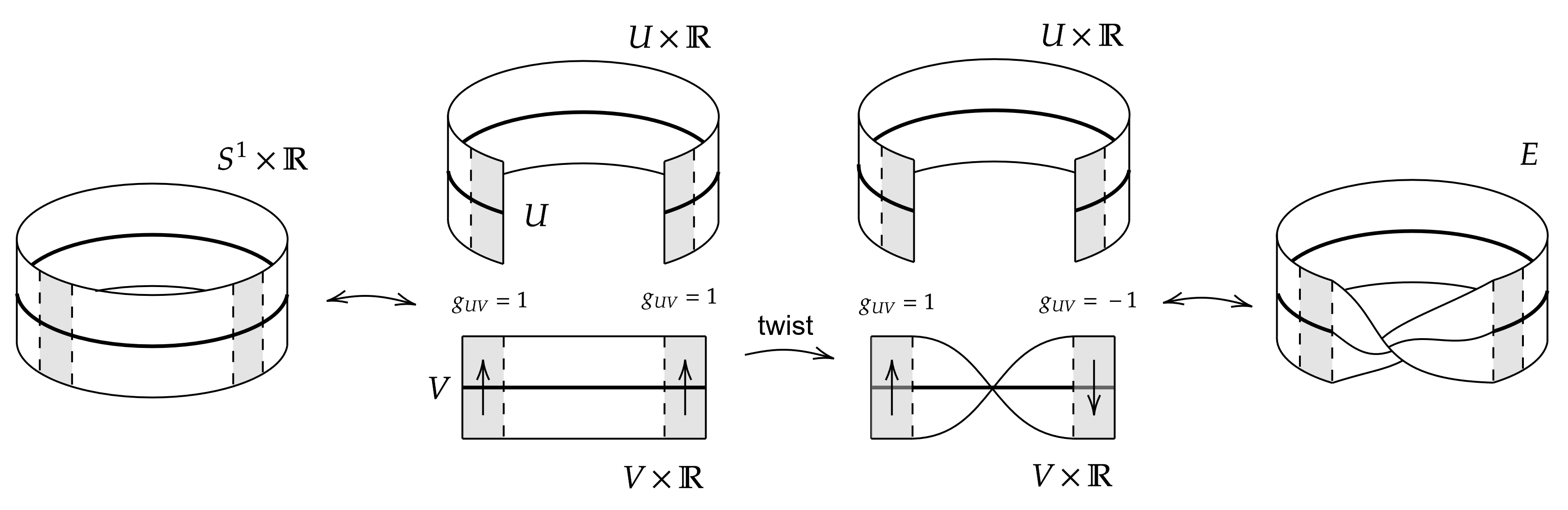
The Möbius strip can be constructed by a non-trivial gluing of two trivial bundles on open subsets U and V of the circle S^{1}. When glued trivially (with g_{UV}=1) one obtains the trivial bundle, but with the non-trivial gluing of g_{UV}=1 on one overlap and g_{UV}=-1 on the second overlap, one obtains the non-trivial bundle E, the Möbius strip. This can be visualised as a "twisting" of one of the local charts.

In mathematics, the fiber bundle construction theorem is a theorem which constructs a fiber bundle with a structure group from a given base space, fiber, group, and a suitable set of transition functions. The theorem also gives conditions under which two such bundles are isomorphic.

The theorem is used in the associated bundle construction, where one starts with a given bundle and changes just the fiber, while keeping all other data the same.

== Formal statement ==
=== Existence ===
Let X and F be topological spaces and let G be a topological group with a continuous left action on F. Given an open cover {U_{i}} of X and a set of continuous functions

$$t_{ij} : U_i \cap U_j \to G$$

defined on each nonempty overlap, such that the cocycle condition

$$t_{ik}(x) = t_{ij}(x)t_{jk}(x) \qquad \forall x \in U_i \cap U_j \cap U_k$$

holds, there exists a fiber bundle E → X with fiber F and structure group G that is trivializable over {U_{i}} with transition functions t_{ij}.

=== Isomorphism ===
Let E′ be another fiber bundle with the same base space, fiber, structure group, and trivializing neighborhoods, but transition functions t′_{ij}. If the action of G on F is faithful, then E′ and E are isomorphic if and only if there exist functions

$$t_i : U_i \to G$$

such that

$$t'_{ij}(x) = t_i(x)^{-1}t_{ij}(x)t_j(x) \qquad \forall x \in U_i \cap U_j.$$

i.e. a gauge transformation on transition data.

In particular, given a base, fiber, structure group, group action on the fiber, trivializing neighborhoods, and a set of transition functions, if the action is faithful, then any two fiber bundles constructed are isomorphic. To see it, use the "if" direction of the isomorphism theorem with $t_i(x) = 1_G$, where $1_G \in G$ is the identity element of $G$. In other words, the construction is unique up to isomorphism.

=== Smooth category ===
The above pair of theorems hold in the topological category. A similar pair of theorems hold in the smooth category, where X and Y are smooth manifolds, G is a Lie group with a smooth left action on Y and the maps t_{ij} are all smooth.

== Construction ==
Existence is proven constructively by the standard coequalizer construction in category theory.

Take the disjoint union of the product spaces $U_i \times F$

$$T = \coprod_{i\in I}U_i \times F = \{(i,x,y) : i\in I, x\in U_i, y\in F\}.$$

Define the equivalence relation

$$(j,x,y) \sim (i,x,t_{ij}(x)\cdot y)\qquad \forall x\in U_i \cap U_j, y\in F.$$

Take the quotient $E := T / \sim$, with the projection map
$$\pi : E \to X, \quad \pi([(i, x, y)]) = x$$
The local trivializations are

$$\phi_i : \pi^{-1}(U_i) \to U_i \times F, \quad \phi_i^{-1}(x,y) = [(i,x,y)].$$

== Associated bundle ==
Let E → X a fiber bundle with fiber F and structure group G, and let F′ be another left G-space. One can form an associated bundle E′ → X with a fiber F′ and structure group G by taking any local trivialization of E and replacing F by F′ in the construction theorem. If one takes F′ to be G with the action of left multiplication then one obtains the associated principal bundle.
