= Tensor bundle =

Concept in mathematics

In mathematics, the tensor bundle of a manifold is the direct sum of all tensor products of the tangent bundle and the cotangent bundle of that manifold. To do calculus on the tensor bundle a connection is needed, except for the special case of the exterior derivative of antisymmetric tensors.

== Definition ==
A tensor bundle is a fiber bundle where the fiber is a tensor product of any number of copies of the tangent space and/or cotangent space of the base space, which is a manifold. As such, the fiber is a vector space and the tensor bundle is a special kind of vector bundle. Explicitly, for fixed non-negative integers $p$ and $q$, a tensor bundle is the fiber bundle

$$V \otimes \cdots \otimes V \otimes V^* \otimes  \cdots  \otimes V^* = V^{\otimes p}\otimes (V^*)^{\otimes q}$$

where V is the tangent bundle of M and V^{∗} is the cotangent bundle of M, and its fibers are

$$V_x \otimes \cdots \otimes V_x \otimes V_x^* \otimes  \cdots  \otimes V_x^* = V_x^{\otimes p}\otimes (V_x^*)^{\otimes q}$$

where $V_x$ is the tangent space of x and $V_x^*$ is the cotangent space of x, for every x in M. The elements of the fibers are tensors of type $(p,q) \in \N\times\N$.

The direct sum of vector bundles allows to consider all these posibilities of tensor bundle for fixed $(p,q)$ as a single mathematical object
$$\bigoplus_{(p,q) \in \N\times\N} V^{\otimes p}\otimes (V^*)^{\otimes q}.$$

== See also ==
- Fiber bundle – Continuous surjection satisfying a local triviality condition
- Spinor bundle – Geometric structure
- Tensor field – Assignment of a tensor continuously varying across a region of space
