= Bundle map =

In mathematics, a bundle map (or bundle morphism) is a function that relates two fiber bundles in a way that respects their internal structure. Fiber bundles are mathematical objects that locally look like a cartesian product of a base space and another space, the typical "fiber", but may have more complex global structure.

A bundle map typically consists of two functions: one between the total spaces of the bundles, and one between their base spaces, such that the diagram formed by the projections commutes. In some cases, both bundles share the same base space, and in others, the map includes a separate function between different base spaces.

There are several versions of bundle maps depending on the specific types of fiber bundles involved—for example, smooth bundles, vector bundles, or principal bundles—and on the category in which they are defined (e.g., topological spaces or smooth manifolds).

The first three sections of this article discuss general fiber bundles in the category of topological spaces, while the fourth section provides other examples.

== Bundle maps over a common base ==
Let $\pi_E\colon E \to M$ and $\pi_F\colon F \to M$ be fiber bundles over a space M. Then a bundle map from E to F over M is a continuous map $\varphi\colon E \to F$ such that $\pi_F\circ\varphi = \pi_E$. That is, the diagram

should commute. Equivalently, for any point x in M, $\varphi$ maps the fiber $E_x= \pi_E^{-1}(\{x\})$ of E over x to the fiber $F_x= \pi_F^{-1}(\{x\})$ of F over x.

== General morphisms of fiber bundles ==
Let π_{E}:E→ M and π_{F}:F→ N be fiber bundles over spaces M and N respectively. Then a continuous map $\varphi : E \to F$ is called a bundle map from E to F if there is a continuous map f:M→ N such that the diagram

commutes, that is, $\pi_F\circ\varphi = f\circ\pi_E$. In other words, $\varphi$ is fiber-preserving, and f is the induced map between the base spaces of E and F. Since π_{E} is surjective, f is uniquely determined by $\varphi$. For a given f, such a bundle map $\varphi$ is said to be a bundle map covering f.

== Relation between the two notions ==
It follows immediately from the definitions that a bundle map over M (in the first sense) is the same thing as a bundle map covering the identity map of M.

Conversely, general bundle maps can be reduced to bundle maps over a fixed base space using the notion of a pullback bundle. If π_{F}:F→ N is a fiber bundle over N and f:M→ N is a continuous map, then the pullback of F by f is a fiber bundle f^{*}F over M whose fiber over x is given by (f^{*}F)_{x} = F_{f(x)}. It then follows that a bundle map from E to F covering f is the same thing as a bundle map from E to f^{*}F over M.

== Variants and generalizations ==
There are two kinds of variation of the general notion of a bundle map.

First, one can consider fiber bundles in a different category of spaces. This leads, for example, to the notion of a smooth bundle map between smooth fiber bundles over a smooth manifold.

Second, one can consider fiber bundles with extra structure in their fibers, and restrict attention to bundle maps which preserve this structure. This leads, for example, to the notion of a (vector) bundle homomorphism between vector bundles, in which the fibers are vector spaces, and a bundle map φ is required to be a linear map on each fiber. In this case, such a bundle map φ (covering f) may also be viewed as a section of the vector bundle Hom(E,f^{*}F) over M, whose fiber over x is the vector space Hom(E_{x},F_{f(x)}) (also denoted L(E_{x},F_{f(x)})) of linear maps from E_{x} to F_{f(x)}.
