= Dale Husemoller =

American mathematician

Dale Husemöller
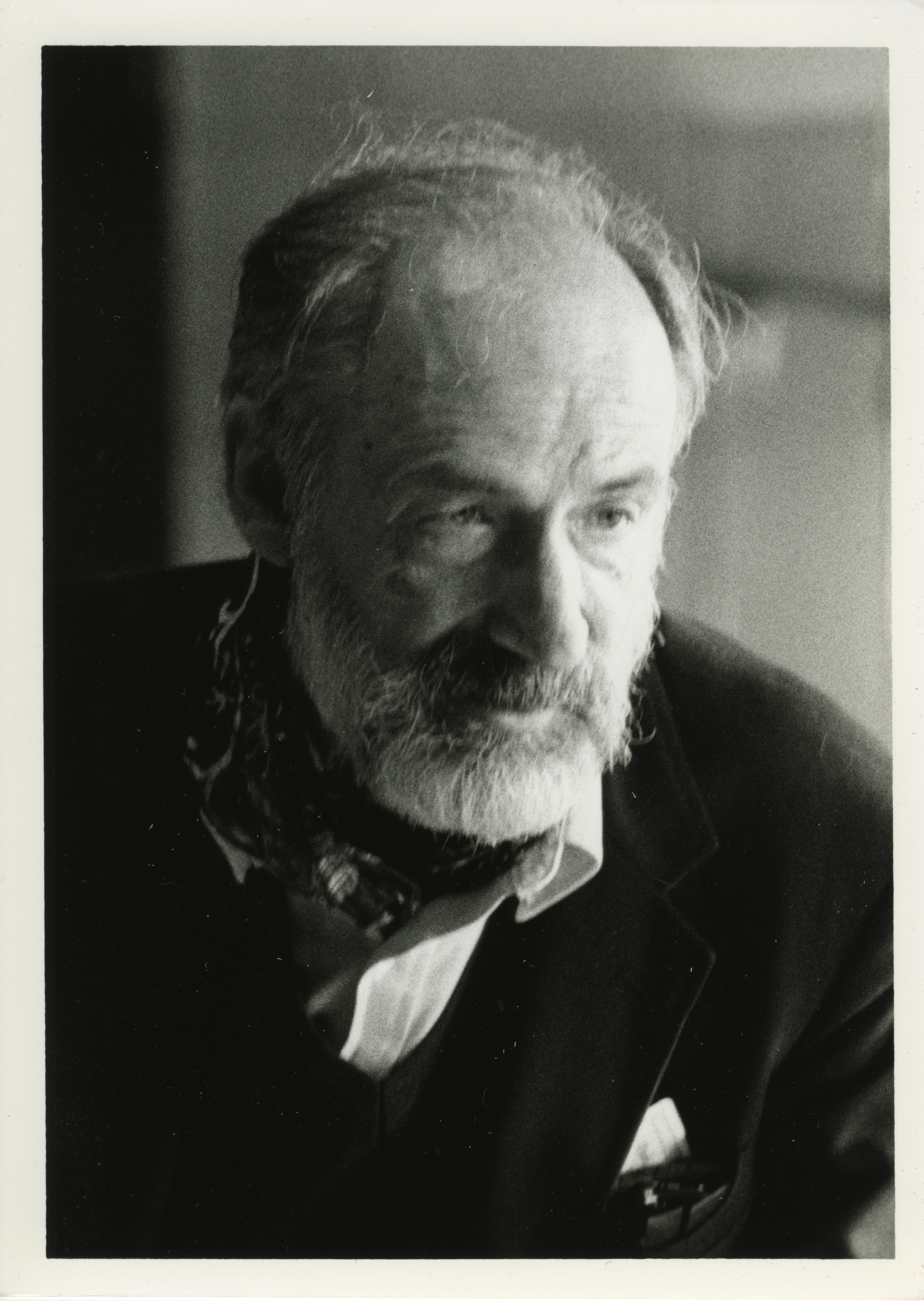
- Husemöller in 2005
- Born: 1933; Austin, Minnesota, US
- Died: 2025
- Title: Professor Emeritus of Mathematics

Academic background
- Education: Harvard University
- Thesis: Mappings, Automorphisms and Coverings of Riemann Surfaces (1959)
- Doctoral advisor: Lars Ahlfors

Academic work
- Discipline: Mathematics
- Sub-discipline: Algebraic topology, homological algebra
- Institutions: University of Rochester (1958–59); Pennsylvania State University (1959–61); Haverford College (1961–96)

Dale Husemöller (also spelled Husemoller) was an American mathematician specializing in algebraic topology and homological algebra who is known for his books on fibre bundles, elliptic curves, and, in collaboration with John Milnor, symmetric bilinear forms.

== Life and career ==
Husemöller was born in 1933 in Austin, Minnesota, USA. He earned his BA in mathematics at the University of Minnesota (December 1952). He began his graduate career there as a physicist, transferring to Harvard University in 1953. There, he switched from physics to the PhD program in mathematics.

He completed his Ph.D. at Harvard University in 1959. His doctoral supervisor was Lars Ahlfors. His dissertation topic was Mappings, Automorphisms and Coverings of Riemann Surfaces.

After the PhD, he served on the faculty of the University of Rochester (1958–59) and the Pennsylvania State University (1959 to 1961). There his interests shifted to topology. He spent most of his career at Haverford College from 1961 until his retirement in 1996.

During Husemöller's career, he spent several sabbatical years as a visiting scholar at the Institut des Hautes Études Scientifiques (IHES) and at the University of Bonn. After retirement, he was visiting lecturer at these two places as well as LMU Munich, Heidelberg University, and the University of Münster, the Tata Institute in Bombay, the Institute of Physics and Mathematics in Tehran, and the Max Planck Institute for Mathematics in Bonn. He was a regular attendee at the Arbeitstagungen in Bonn.

Professor Husemöller's five children Carl, Anna, Erich, Kurt, and Greta grew up on the Haverford College campus, and spent sabbatical years and subsequent summers with him at the Résidence de l'Ormaille at the IHES in France, and for another year at the Ernst-Moritz-Arndt Gymnasium in Bonn while he was at the university there. All five received their BAs at Haverford. Professor Husemöller had 10 grandchildren, Colette, Adrian, Ingrid, Paloma, Atena, Alexei, Annika, Jacob, Rose, and Mbali. He died at his home in western Massachusetts at age 91 on August 30, 2025.

== Bibliography ==
His books and some of his papers include:

- Husemöller, Dale (1962). "Ramified Coverings of Riemann Surfaces," Duke Mathematical Journal, volume 29, pp. 167–79.
- Husemöller, Dale (1966). Fibre Bundles (1st ed.). McGraw Hill. ISBN 0387940871. 2nd Edition (Springer Verlag), 1975; 3rd Edition (Springer Verlag), 1993. Russian Edition Rassloenye Prostranstva (Moscow: Izd. Mir) 1970.
- Husemöller, Dale with John Milnor (1974). Symmetric Bilinear Forms (Springer) Russian Edition Simmetricheskie bilineĭnye formy (Moscow: Navka), 1986.
- Husemöller, Dale with J.C. Moore and James Stasheff (1974). "Differential Homological Algebra and Homogeneous Spaces," in Journal of Pure and Applied Algebra, vol 5, pp. 115–85.
- Husemöller, Dale with Enrico Bombieri (1975). "Classification and Embeddings of Surfaces," in Proceedings of Symposia in Pure Mathematics, vol 29, pp. 320–420.
- Husemöller, Dale (1987). Elliptic Curves (PDF) (1st ed.). Springer. ISBN 1441930256. 2nd Edition (Springer) 2004.
- Husemöller, Dale with Pierre Deligne (1987). "Survey of Drinfel'd Modules," Current Trends in Arithmetic Algebraic Geometry, Contemporary Mathematics, vol. 67, ed. Ken Ribett, pp. 25–92.
- Husemöller, Dale (1991). Lectures on Cyclic Homology. Tata Lectures.
- Husemöller, Dale (2008). Basic Bundle Theory and K-Cohomology Invariants. Lecture Notes in Physics 726 (Springer).
