= Ülo Lumiste =

Estonian mathematician

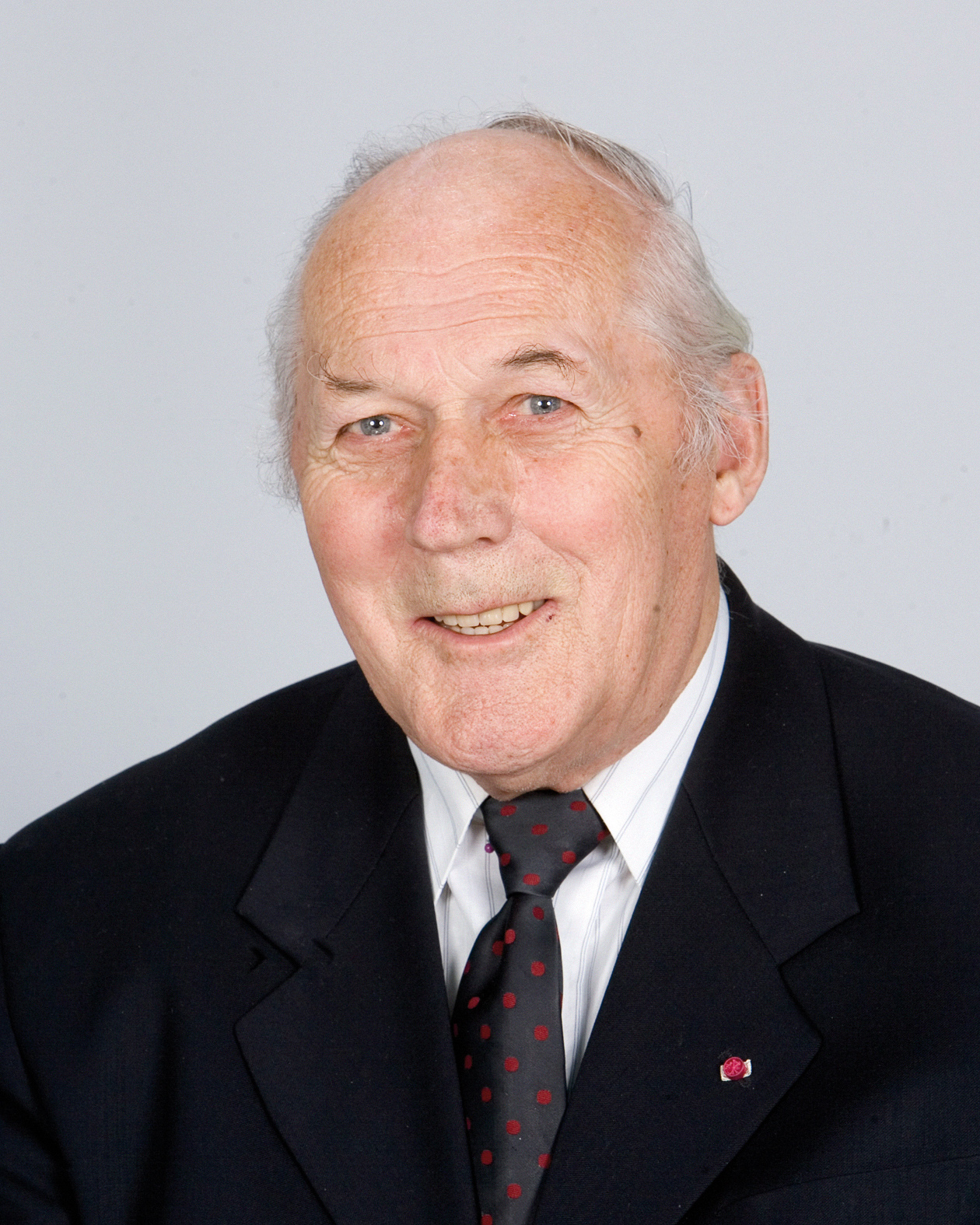
Ülo Lumiste

Ülo Lumiste (30 June 1929 Vändra – 20 November 2017) was an Estonian mathematician.

In 1952 he graduated from the University of Tartu in mathematics. In 1968 he defended his doctoral thesis at Kazan University. Since 1959 he taught at the University of Tartu.

Since 1993 he was a member of Estonian Academy of Sciences.

His main field of research was differential geometry. In 1960s he established the school of Estonian differential geometry.

== Awards ==
- 1999 and 2012: Estonian National Research Award
- 1999: Order of the White Star, III class.
