= Pullback bundle =

Fiber bundle induced by a map of its base space

In mathematics, a pullback bundle or induced bundle is the fiber bundle that is induced by a map of its base-space. Given a fiber bundle $\pi:E\rightarrow B$ and a continuous map $f:B'\rightarrow B$ one can define a "pullback" of $E$ by $f$ as a bundle $f^*E$ over $B'$. The fiber of $f^*E$ over a point $b'$ in $B'$ is just the fiber of $E$ over $f(b')$. Thus $f^*E$ is the disjoint union of all these fibers equipped with a suitable topology.

== Formal definition ==
Let $\pi:E\rightarrow B$ be a fiber bundle with abstract fiber $F$ and let $f:B'\rightarrow B$ be a continuous map. Define the pullback bundle by
$$f^{*}E = \{(b',e) \in B' \times E \mid f(b') = \pi(e)\}\subseteq B'\times E$$

and equip it with the subspace topology and the projection map $\pi':f^*E\rightarrow B'$ given by the projection onto the first factor, i.e.,
$$\pi'(b',e) = b'.\,$$

The projection onto the second factor gives a map
$$h \colon f^{*}E \to E$$

such that the following diagram commutes:
$$\begin{array} {ccc}
f^{\ast}E & \stackrel {h} {\longrightarrow} & E\\
{\pi}' \downarrow &  & \downarrow \pi\\
B' & \stackrel f {\longrightarrow} & B
\end{array}$$

If $(U,\varphi)$ is a local trivialization of $E$ then $(f^{-1}U,\psi)$ is a local trivialization of $f^*E$ where
$$\psi(b',e) = (b', \mbox{proj}_2(\varphi(e))).\,$$

It then follows that $f^*E$ is a fiber bundle over $B'$ with fiber $F$. The bundle $f^*E$ is called the pullback of E by f or the bundle induced by f. The map $h$ is then a bundle morphism covering $f$.

== Properties ==
Any section $s$ of $E$ over $B$ induces a section of $f^*E$ over $B'$, called the pullback section $f^*s$, simply by defining

$f^*s(b'):=(b',s(f(b')))$ for all $b'\in B'$.

If the bundle $E\rightarrow B$ has structure group $G$ with transition functions $t_{ij}$ (with respect to a family of local trivializations $\{(U_i,\varphi_i)\}$) then the pullback bundle $f^*E$ also has structure group $G$. The transition functions in $f^*E$ are given by

$$f^{*}t_{ij} = t_{ij} \circ f.$$

If $E\rightarrow B$ is a vector bundle or principal bundle then so is the pullback $f^*E$. In the case of a principal bundle the right action of $G$ on $f^*E$ is given by

$$(x,e)\cdot g = (x,e\cdot g)$$

It then follows that the map $h$ covering $f$ is equivariant and so defines a morphism of principal bundles.

In the language of category theory, the pullback bundle construction is an example of the more general categorical pullback. As such it satisfies the corresponding universal property.

The construction of the pullback bundle can be carried out in subcategories of the category of topological spaces, such as the category of smooth manifolds. The latter construction is useful in differential geometry and topology.

== Bundles and sheaves ==
Bundles may also be described by their sheaves of sections. The pullback of bundles then corresponds to the inverse image of sheaves, which is a contravariant functor. A sheaf, however, is more naturally a covariant object, since it has a pushforward, called the direct image of a sheaf. The tension and interplay between bundles and sheaves, or inverse and direct image, can be advantageous in many areas of geometry. However, the direct image of a sheaf of sections of a bundle is not in general the sheaf of sections of some direct image bundle, so that although the notion of a 'pushforward of a bundle' is defined in some contexts (for example, the pushforward by a diffeomorphism), in general it is better understood in the category of sheaves, because the objects it creates cannot in general be bundles.

== Sources ==
- Steenrod, Norman (1999) [1951]. The Topology of Fibre Bundles. Princeton: Princeton University Press. ISBN 9780691005485.
- Husemoller, Dale (1994). Fibre Bundles. Graduate Texts in Mathematics. Vol. 20 (Third ed.). New York: Springer-Verlag. ISBN 978-0-387-94087-8.
- Lawson, H. Blaine; Michelsohn, Marie-Louise (1989). Spin Geometry. Princeton University Press. ISBN 978-0-691-08542-5.
