= Section (fiber bundle) =

Right inverse of a fiber bundle map

A section $\sigma$ of a bundle $\pi \colon E\to B$. A section $\sigma$ allows the base space $B$ to be identified with a subspace $\sigma(B)$ of $E$.

A vector field on $\mathbb{R}^2$. A section of a tangent vector bundle is a vector field.

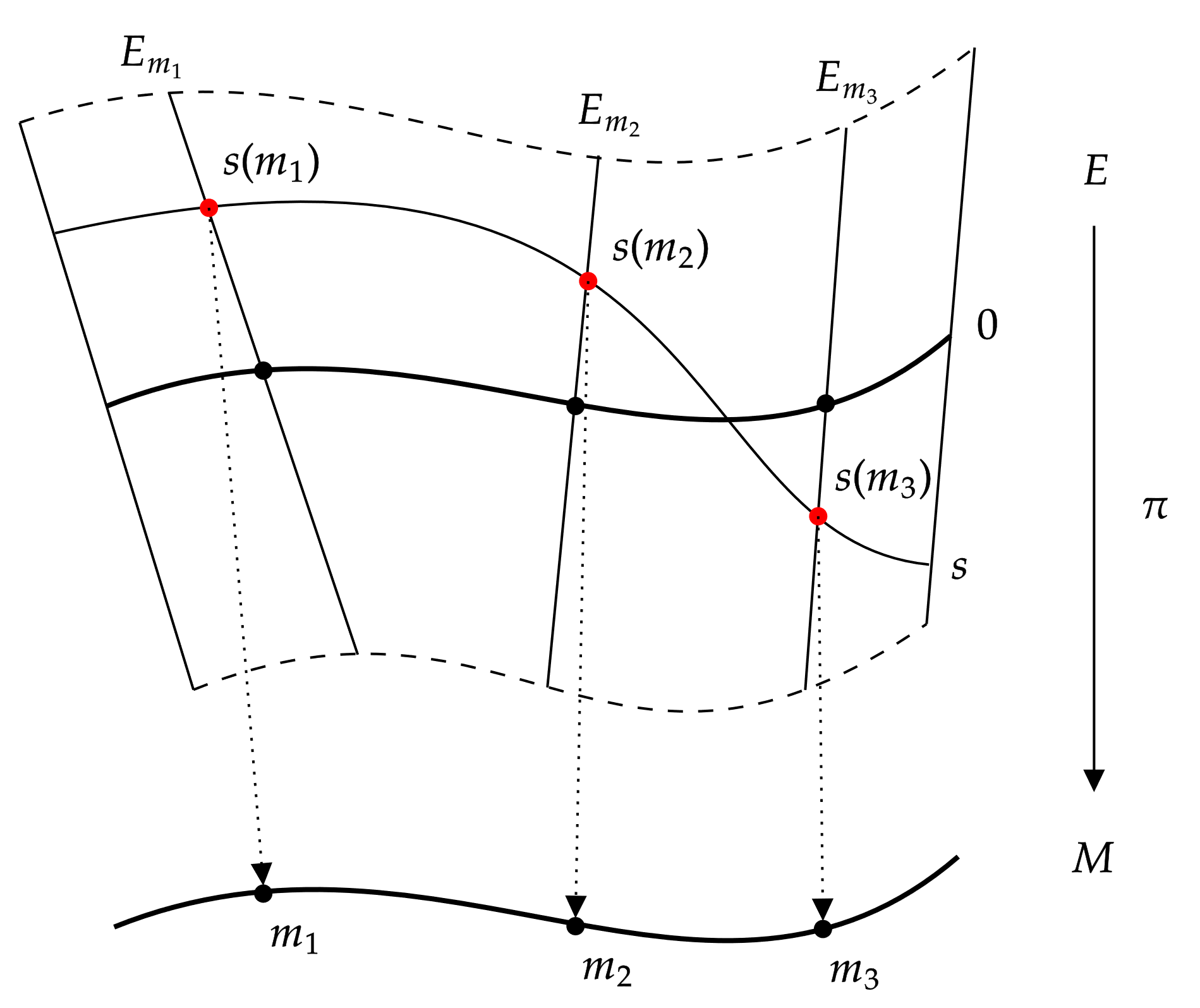
A vector bundle $E$ over a base $M$ with section $s$.

In the mathematical field of topology, a section (or cross section) of a fiber bundle $E$ is a continuous right inverse of the projection function $\pi$. In other words, if $E$ is a fiber bundle over a base space, $B$:

$$\pi \colon E \to B$$

then a section of that fiber bundle is a continuous map,

$$\sigma \colon B \to E$$

such that

$\pi(\sigma(x)) = x$ for all $x \in B$.

A section is an abstract characterization of what it means to be a graph. The graph of a function $g\colon B \to Y$ can be identified with a function taking its values in the Cartesian product $E = B \times Y$, of $B$ and $Y$:

$$\sigma\colon B\to E, \quad \sigma(x) = (x,g(x)) \in E.$$

Let $\pi\colon E \to B$ be the projection onto the first factor: $\pi(x,y) = x$. Then a graph is any function $\sigma$ for which $\pi(\sigma(x)) = x$.

The language of fibre bundles allows this notion of a section to be generalized to the case when $E$ is not necessarily a Cartesian product. If $\pi\colon E \to B$ is a fibre bundle, then a section is a choice of point $\sigma(x)$ in each of the fibres. The condition $\pi(\sigma(x)) = x$ simply means that the section at a point $x$ must lie over $x$. (See image.)

For example, when $E$ is a vector bundle a section of $E$ is an element of the vector space $E_x$ lying over each point $x \in B$. In particular, a vector field on a smooth manifold $M$ is a choice of tangent vector at each point of $M$: this is a section of the tangent bundle of $M$. Likewise, a 1-form on $M$ is a section of the cotangent bundle.

Sections, particularly of principal bundles and vector bundles, are also very important tools in differential geometry. In this setting, the base space $B$ is a smooth manifold $M$, and $E$ is assumed to be a smooth fiber bundle over $M$ (i.e., $E$ is a smooth manifold and $\pi\colon E\to M$ is a smooth map). In this case, one considers the space of smooth sections of $E$ over an open set $U$, denoted $C^{\infty}(U,E)$. It is also useful in geometric analysis to consider spaces of sections with intermediate regularity (e.g., $C^k$ sections, or sections with regularity in the sense of Hölder conditions or Sobolev spaces).

== Local and global sections ==
Fiber bundles do not in general have such global sections (consider, for example, the fiber bundle over $S^1$ with fiber $F = \mathbb{R} \setminus \{0\}$ obtained by taking the Möbius bundle and removing the zero section), so it is also useful to define sections only locally. A local section of a fiber bundle is a continuous map $s \colon U \to E$ where $U$ is an open set in $B$ and $\pi(s(x))=x$ for all $x$ in $U$. If $(U, \varphi)$ is a local trivialization of $E$, where $\varphi$ is a homeomorphism from $\pi^{-1}(U)$ to $U\times F$ (where $F$ is the fiber), then local sections always exist over $U$ in bijective correspondence with continuous maps from $U$ to $F$. The (local) sections form a sheaf over $B$ called the sheaf of sections of $E$.

The space of continuous sections of a fiber bundle $E$ over $U$ is sometimes denoted $C(U,E)$, while the space of global sections of $E$ is often denoted $\Gamma(E)$ or $\Gamma(B,E)$.

=== Extending to global sections ===
Sections are studied in homotopy theory and algebraic topology, where one of the main goals is to account for the existence or non-existence of global sections. An obstruction denies the existence of global sections since the space is too "twisted". More precisely, obstructions "obstruct" the possibility of extending a local section to a global section due to the space's "twistedness". Obstructions are indicated by particular characteristic classes, which are cohomological classes. For example, a principal bundle has a global section if and only if it is trivial. On the other hand, a vector bundle always has a global section, namely the zero section. However, the Euler class obstructs the existence of a nowhere vanishing section.

==== Generalizations ====
Obstructions to extending local sections may be generalized in the following manner: take a topological space and form a category whose objects are open subsets, and morphisms are inclusions. Thus we use a category to generalize a topological space. We generalize the notion of a "local section" using sheaves of abelian groups, which assigns to each object an abelian group (analogous to local sections).

There is an important distinction here: intuitively, local sections are like "vector fields" on an open subset of a topological space. So at each point, an element of a fixed vector space is assigned. However, sheaves can "continuously change" the vector space (or more generally abelian group).

This entire process is really the global section functor, which assigns to each sheaf its global section. Then sheaf cohomology enables us to consider a similar extension problem while "continuously varying" the abelian group. The theory of characteristic classes generalizes the idea of obstructions to our extensions.

== See also ==
- Section (category theory)
- Fibration
- Gauge theory (mathematics)
- Principal bundle
- Pullback bundle
- Vector bundle
