= Boothby-Wang construction =

Method in contact geometry

In contact geometry, a field in mathematics, the Boothby-Wang construction (or Boothby-Wang theorem) characterises a special class of contact manifolds $(P,\alpha)$ as principal $S^1$-bundles over symplectic manifolds $(M,\omega)$ where $\omega$ defines an integral cohomology class. The proof employs the theory of connection and curvature forms.

The name Boothby-Wang construction is used sometimes only for the construction of the contact manifold starting from the symplectic form (as part of contactisation procedures), sometimes for the entire statement (i.e. also the converse construction of the symplectic manifold starting from the contact form). The resulting fibration $(P,\alpha) \to (M,\omega)$ is sometimes also called Boothby-Wang Fibration.

This result was proved in 1959 by Boothby and Wang and has been subject to several generalisations.

== Preliminaries ==
=== Regular contact manifolds ===
Consider any contact manifold $(P,\alpha)$; since its Reeb vector field $R_\alpha \in \mathfrak{X}(P)$ is nowhere zero, the orbits of the flow of $R_\alpha$ (also called the Reeb orbits) define a regular foliation $\mathcal{F}_{R_\alpha}$ of rank 1. The contact form $\alpha \in \Omega^1 (P)$ is called regular if such foliation $\mathcal{F}_{R_\alpha}$ is simple, i.e. if the leaf space $P/\mathcal{F}_{R_\alpha}$ is a smooth manifold such that the projection $P \to P/\mathcal{F}_{R_\alpha}$ is a surjective submersion.

Assuming that $P$ is connected and $R_\alpha$ is complete, this regularity condition implies that $P \to P/\mathcal{F}_{R_\alpha}$ is either a principal $\mathbb{R}$-bundle or a principal $S^1$-bundle (since the Reeb orbits are either not periodic, or periodic with the same minimal period).

In the case when $P$ is furthermore compact (which automatically implies that $R_\alpha$ is complete), since the fibres of $P \to P/\mathcal{F}_{R_\alpha}$ are closed sets of $P$, they must be compact as well, hence they must be circles; this means that the Reeb orbits are periodic with the same minimal period and $P \to P/\mathcal{F}_{R_\alpha}$ is a principal $S^1$-bundle.

For these reasons, in the complete setting, other authors define a regular (or Boothby-Wang) contact form $\alpha \in \Omega^1 (P)$ with a stronger condition: all Reeb orbits are required to be circles with the same minimal periods. This last condition is equivalent to saying that the Reeb vector field $R_\alpha \in \mathfrak{X}(P)$ generates a free $S^1$-action.

=== Integral symplectic manifolds ===
A closed differential 2-form $\omega \in \Omega^2 (M)$ is called integral if its induced de Rham cohomology class $[\omega] \in H^2_{dR} (M)$ lies in the image of $H^2 (M, \mathbb{Z}) \to H^2 (M,\mathbb{R}) \cong H^2_{dR} (M)$. Equivalently, its period group

$\mathrm{Per}(\omega):= \left\{ \int_\gamma \omega \ | \ \gamma: S^2 \to M \text{ homology 2-cycle } \right\} \subset \mathbb{R}$

is of the kind $k\mathbb{Z}$ for some integer $k \in \mathbb{Z}$. Notice that, depending on the normalisation conventions, one might have to add a multiplicative factor $\frac{1}{2\pi}$.

=== Principal bundles and connections ===
A crucial step in the proof relies on the following fact: given any principal $G$-bundle $\pi: P \to M$, there is a 1-1 correspondence between $k$-forms on $M$ and $k$-forms on $P$ which are basic, i.e. $G$-invariant and $\pi$-horizontal (vanishing on any $\pi$-vertical vector field). In particular, given $\beta \in \Omega^k (P)$, there is a unique $\omega \in \Omega^k (M)$ such that $\beta = \pi^*\omega$.

In general, a connection form on $\pi: P \to M$ is a form $\alpha \in \Omega^1 (P,\mathfrak{g})$ with values in the Lie algebra $\mathfrak{g} := \mathrm{Lie} (G)$ satisfying the $G$-equivariance

$(R_g)^*\alpha = g^{-1} \cdot \alpha \quad \forall g \in G$

and the condition

$\alpha (x^\dagger) = x \quad \forall x \in \mathfrak{g}$

where $x^\dagger \in \mathfrak{X}(P)$ denotes the fundamental vector field associated to $x \in \mathfrak{g}$, i.e. the image by the infinitesimal action $\mathfrak{g} \to \mathfrak{X}(P)$.

In the case of the abelian Lie group $G = S^1$, we have the abelian Lie algebra $\mathfrak{g} = (\mathbb{R},+)$, so that the adjoint representation $g^{-1} \cdot$ is trivial and the $G$-equivariance boils down to the $G$-invariance $(R_g)^*\alpha = \alpha$ for every $g \in G$; in this case, this is equivalent to $\mathcal{L}_{x^\dagger} (\alpha) = 0$ for every $x \in \mathbb{R}$.

== From regular contact manifolds to integral symplectic manifolds ==
Let $(P,\alpha)$ be a compact regular contact manifold. Then $\pi: P \to M:= P/S^1$ is a principal $S^1$-bundle and there is a unique integral symplectic form $\omega \in \Omega^2 (M)$ such that $d\alpha = \pi^*\omega$. If one adopts the stronger condition of regularity, i.e. requires that the Reeb vector field generates a free $S^1$-action, the compactness hypothesis is not needed.

This follows from the more complete statement below (using the extra fact that, since $S^1$ is compact, any $S^1$-action is automatically proper; then $M:= P/S^1$ is a smooth manifold and $\pi$ is a principal $S^1$-bundle).

Let $\pi: P \to M$ be a principal $S^1$-bundle over a $2n$-dimensional manifold $M$, and let $\alpha \in \Omega^1 (P,\mathbb{R}) = \Omega^1 (P)$ be a connection form (where the coefficient space $\mathbb{R}$ is identified with the Lie algebra of the abelian Lie group $S^1$). Then

- there is a unique closed differential 2-form $\omega \in \Omega^2 (M)$ such that $d\alpha = \pi^*\omega$;
- the class $[\omega] \in H^2_{dR} (M)$ is the image of the first Chern class $c_1 (P) \in H^2 (M,\mathbb{Z})$ via $H^2 (M, \mathbb{Z}) \to H^2 (M,\mathbb{R}) \cong H^2_{dR} (M)$;
- $\omega$ is nondegenerate (i.e. it is a symplectic form) if and only if $\alpha$ is a contact form.

Moreover, if this happens,

- the fundamental vector field associated to $1 \in \mathbb{R} \cong \mathrm{Lie}(S^1)$ is the Reeb vector field of $\alpha$;
- the Reeb orbits are circles and the contact form is regular.

=== Proof ===
One checks first that $d\alpha \in \Omega^2 (P)$ is basic. Indeed, it is $S^1$-equivariant since $\alpha$ is so; moreover, it is horizontal since $\pi$-vertical vector field are fundamental vector field of the kind $x^\dagger \in \mathfrak{X}(P)$, for $x \in \mathbb{R} = \mathrm{Lie}(S^1)$, hence, by the properties of a connection form,

$d\alpha (x^\dagger, \cdot) = \iota_{x^\dagger} (d\alpha) = \cancel{\mathcal{L}_{x^\dagger} \alpha} - d (\iota_{x^\dagger} \alpha) = - d (\alpha (x^\dagger) ) = d (x) = 0.$

Then, by the lemma mentioned above, there is a unique $\omega \in \Omega^2 (M)$ such that $d\alpha = \pi^*\omega$; since exterior derivative and pullbacks commute, $\omega$ is automatically closed.

Using Chern-Weil theory, the image via $H^2 (M, \mathbb{Z}) \to H^2 (M,\mathbb{R}) \cong H^2_{dR} (M)$ of the first Chern class of $P$ can be computed precisely by choosing a connection $\alpha \in \Omega^1 (P)$ and considering the induced $\omega \in \Omega^2 (M)$, so that $c_1 (P) = [\omega]$.

Furthermore, $\alpha \wedge (d\alpha)^n = \alpha \wedge \pi^* (\omega^n) \neq 0$ (i.e. $\alpha$ is a contact form) if and only if $\omega^n \neq 0$ (i.e. $\omega$ is nondegenerate).

Last, consider the fundamental vector field $R:= a(1) = 1^\dagger \in \mathfrak{X}(P)$, where $a: \mathrm{Lie}(S^1) \cong \mathbb{R} \to \mathfrak{X}(P)$ is the infinitesimal action. To prove that it coincides with the Reeb vector field $R_\alpha \in \mathfrak{X}(P)$, one checks that it satisfies $\alpha(R) = 1$ and $\iota_R (d\alpha) = 0$. But the first condition follows from $\alpha (x^\dagger) = x$ for $x = 1$, while the second condition follows from the fact that fundamental vector fields are $\pi$-vertical, hence

$\iota_R (d\alpha) = (\pi^*\omega) (R, \cdot) = \omega (\cancel{d\pi(R)},d\pi(\cdot)) = 0$.

The Reeb orbits coincide therefore with the fibres of $\pi: P \to M$, i.e. they are circles, and the contact form is regular.

== From integral symplectic manifolds to regular contact manifolds ==
Let $(M,\omega)$ be an integral symplectic manifold. Then there is a principal $S^1$-bundle $\pi: P \to M$ and a regular contact form $\alpha \in \Omega^1 (P)$ such that $d\alpha = \pi^*\omega$.

This follows from the more complete statement below.

Let $M$ be a $2n$-dimensional manifold and $\omega \in \Omega^2 (M)$ a closed differential 2-form which is integral. Then

- there is a principal $S^1$-bundle $\pi: P \to M$ with first Chern class $[\omega] \in H^2 (M,\mathbb{Z})$;
- there is a connection form $\alpha \in \Omega^1 (P,\mathbb{R}) = \Omega^1 (P)$ such that $d\alpha = \pi^*\omega$;
- $\omega$ is nondegenerate (i.e. it is a symplectic form) if and only if $\alpha$ is a contact form.

Moreover, if this happens,

- the fundamental vector field associated to $1 \in \mathbb{R} \cong \mathrm{Lie}(S^1)$ is the Reeb vector field of $\alpha$;
- the Reeb orbits are circles and the contact form is regular.

=== Proof ===
The existence of a principal $S^1$-bundle $\pi: P \to M$ with first Chern class $[\omega] \in H^2 (M)$ follows from the general classification of principal $S^1$-bundles via $H^2(M,\mathbb{Z})$.

Picking any connection form $\alpha_0 \in \Omega^1 (P,\mathbb{R}) = \Omega^1 (P)$, the differential $d\alpha_0 \in \Omega^2 (P)$ is basic by the same arguments as in the previous proof. Then, by the lemma mentioned above there is an induced closed 2-form $\omega_0 \in \Omega^2 (M)$ such that $d\alpha_0 = \pi^*\omega_0$. By definition of Chern class, one has $[\omega] = [\omega_0]$, i.e. $\omega - \omega_0 = d\beta$ for some $\beta \in \Omega^1(M)$. Then $\alpha := \alpha_0 + \pi^*\beta \in \Omega^1 (P)$ is by construction a connection form satisfying $d\alpha = \pi^*\omega$.

Last, again with the same arguments as in the previous proof, $\alpha$ is a contact form if and only if $\omega$ is nondegenerate, and the further two points hold.

== Relation to geometric quantisation ==
A prequantum (or prequantisation) line bundle over a symplectic manifold $(M,\omega)$ is a complex line bundle $L \to M$ together with a fibrewise Hermitian metric $h$ and a Hermitian connection $\nabla$ such that its curvature $F_\nabla$ satisfies $F_\nabla = \pm i \omega$ (the sign depends on the conventions). The existence of this object constitutes the first step (before choosing a polarisation) to perform geometric quantisation, and it is obstructed by the integrability condition of $(M,\omega)$.

The principal bundle $(P,\alpha) \to (M,\omega)$ from the Boothby-Wang construction is equivalent to the data of a prequantisation line bundle. Indeed, given $P \to M$ one defines $L \to M$ as the vector bundle $L:= (P \times \mathbb{C})/S^1$ associated to the natural representation $\mathbb{C} \in \mathrm{Rep} (S^1)$. Conversely, given $(L,h) \to M$, one defines $P \to M$ as the principal bundle of unitary frames $\mathrm{Fr}(L,h) \subset \mathrm{Fr}(L)$, with structure group the unitary group $U(1) \cong S^1$. The rest of the equivalence follows from the standard equivalence between vector bundle connections and principal connections, and the fact that the curvature of a connection form $\alpha \in \Omega^1 (P, \mathbb{R}) = \Omega^1 (P)$ is given by the Maurer-Cartan expression $d\alpha + \frac{1}{2} \cancel{[\alpha,\alpha]} = d\alpha \in \Omega^2 (P)$ (since the Lie algebra $\mathrm{Lie} (S^1) = \mathbb{R}$ is abelian).

The Boothby-Wang construction yield therefore an equivalence between regular contact manifolds and prequantisation bundles (over a given integral symplectic manifold).

== Example ==
Consider the free and proper action of the Lie group $S^1 \subset \mathbb{C}$ on the sphere $S^{2n+1} \subset \mathbb{C}^{n+1}$ by multiplication on each complex coordinate; its quotient can be identified with the complex projective space $\mathbb{CP}^n$. Then the resulting principal $S^1$-bundle $(S^{2n+1},\alpha_{\mathrm{std}}) \to (\mathbb{CP}^n,\omega_{\mathrm{FS}})$ is a Boothby-Wang fibration, where $S^{2n+1}$ is endowed with the standard contact form $\alpha_{\mathrm{std}}$, which is automatically regular, and $\mathbb{CP}^n$ is endowed with the Fubini-Study symplectic form $\omega_{\mathrm{FS}}$, which is automatically integral.

In the case $n=1$ one recovers the classical Hopf fibration $S^3\to\mathbb{CP}^1 \cong S^2$.
