= Localization formula for equivariant cohomology =

Geometry formula

In differential geometry, the localization formula states that for an equivariantly closed equivariant differential form $\alpha$ on an orbifold M with a torus action and for a sufficient small $\xi$ in the Lie algebra of the torus T, we have

$${1 \over d_M} \int_M \alpha(\xi) = \sum_F {1 \over d_F} \int_F {\alpha(\xi) \over e_T(F)(\xi)}$$

where the sum runs over all connected components F of the set $M^T$ of fixed points, $d_M$ is the orbifold multiplicity of $M$ (which equals $1$ if $M$ is a manifold), and $e_T(F)$ is the equivariant Euler form of the normal bundle of $F$.

The formula allows one to compute the equivariant cohomology ring of the orbifold M (a particular kind of differentiable stack) from the equivariant cohomology of its fixed point components, up to multiplicities and Euler forms. No analog of such results holds in the non-equivariant cohomology.

One important consequence of the formula is the Duistermaat–Heckman theorem, which states: supposing there is a Hamiltonian circle action (for simplicity) on a compact symplectic manifold M of dimension 2n,

$$\int_M e^{-tH} \omega^n/n! = \sum_p {e^{-tH(p)} \over t^n \prod \alpha_j(p)}.$$

where H is Hamiltonian for the circle action, the sum is over points fixed by the circle action and $\alpha_j(p)$ are eigenvalues on the tangent space at p (cf. Lie group action.)

The localization formula can also computes the Fourier transform of (Kostant's symplectic form on) coadjoint orbit, yielding the Harish-Chandra's integration formula, which in turns gives Kirillov's character formula.

The localization theorem for equivariant cohomology in non-rational coefficients is discussed in Daniel Quillen's papers.

== History ==
An alternative name for the formula is Borel cohomology, after Armand Borel

== Non-abelian localization ==
The localization theorem states that the equivariant cohomology can be recovered, up to torsion elements, from the equivariant cohomology of the fixed point subset. This does not extend, in verbatim, to the non-abelian action. But, there is still a version of the localization theorem for non-abelian actions.
