= Principal orbit type theorem =

In mathematics, the principal orbit type theorem states that compact Lie group acting smoothly on a connected differentiable manifold has a principal orbit type.

== Definitions ==
Suppose G is a compact Lie group acting smoothly on a connected differentiable manifold M.

- An isotropy group is the subgroup of G fixing a chosen point of M.
- An isotropy type is a conjugacy class of isotropy groups.
- The principal orbit type theorem states that there is a unique isotropy type such that the set of points of M with isotropy groups in this isotropy type is open and dense.
- The principal orbit type is the space G/H, where H is a subgroup in the isotropy type above.
