= Equivariant bundle =

In geometry and topology, given a group G (which may be a topological or Lie group), an equivariant bundle is a fiber bundle $\pi\colon E\to B$ such that the total space $E$ and the base space $B$ are both G-spaces (continuous or smooth, depending on the setting) and the projection map $\pi$ between them is equivariant: $\pi \circ g = g \circ \pi$ with some extra requirement depending on a typical fiber.

For example, an equivariant vector bundle is an equivariant bundle such that the action of G restricts to a linear isomorphism between fibres.
