= Equivariant sheaf =

Concept in mathematics

In mathematics, given an action $\sigma: G \times_S X \to X$ of a group scheme G on a scheme X over a base scheme S, an equivariant sheaf F on X is a sheaf of $\mathcal{O}_X$-modules together with the isomorphism of $\mathcal{O}_{G \times_S X}$-modules

$\phi: \sigma^* F \xrightarrow{\simeq} p_2^*F$

that satisfies the cocycle condition: writing m for multiplication,

$$p_{23}^* \phi \circ (1_G \times \sigma)^* \phi = (m \times 1_X)^* \phi$$.

== Notes on the definition ==
On the stalk level, the cocycle condition says that the isomorphism $F_{gh \cdot x} \simeq F_x$ is the same as the composition $F_{g \cdot h \cdot x} \simeq F_{h \cdot x} \simeq F_x$; i.e., the associativity of the group action. The condition that the unit of the group acts as the identity is also a consequence: apply $(e \times e \times 1)^*, e: S \to G$ to both sides to get $(e \times 1)^* \phi \circ (e \times 1)^* \phi = (e \times 1)^* \phi$ and so $(e \times 1)^* \phi$ is the identity.

Note that $\phi$ is an additional data; it is "a lift" of the action of G on X to the sheaf F. Moreover, when G is a connected algebraic group, F an invertible sheaf and X is reduced, the cocycle condition is automatic: any isomorphism $\sigma^* F \simeq p_2^* F$ automatically satisfies the cocycle condition.

If the action of G is free, then the notion of an equivariant sheaf simplifies to a sheaf on the quotient X/G, because of the descent along torsors.

By Yoneda's lemma, to give the structure of an equivariant sheaf to an $\mathcal{O}_X$-module F is the same as to give group homomorphisms for rings R over $S$,

$G(R) \to \operatorname{Aut}(X \times_S \operatorname{Spec}R, F \otimes_S R)$.

There is also a definition of equivariant sheaves in terms of simplicial sheaves. Alternatively, one can define an equivariant sheaf to be an equivariant object in the category of, say, coherent sheaves.

== Linearized line bundles ==
A structure of an equivariant sheaf on an invertible sheaf or a line bundle is also called a linearization.

Let X be a complete variety over an algebraically closed field acted by a connected reductive group G and L an invertible sheaf on it. If X is normal, then some tensor power $L^n$ of L is linearizable.

Also, if L is very ample and linearized, then there is a G-linear closed immersion from X to $\mathbf{P}^N$ such that $\mathcal{O}_{\mathbf{P}^N}(1)$ is linearized and the linearization on L is induced by that of $\mathcal{O}_{\mathbf{P}^N}(1)$.

Tensor products and the inverses of linearized invertible sheaves are again linearized in the natural way. Thus, the isomorphism classes of the linearized invertible sheaves on a scheme X form an abelian group. There is a homomorphism to the Picard group of X which forgets the linearization; this homomorphism is neither injective nor surjective in general, and its kernel can be identified with the isomorphism classes of linearizations of the trivial line bundle.

See Example 2.16 of for an example of a variety for which most line bundles are not linearizable.

== Dual action on sections of equivariant sheaves ==
Given an algebraic group G and a G-equivariant sheaf F on X over a field k, let $V =\Gamma(X, F)$ be the space of global sections. It then admits the structure of a G-module; i.e., V is a linear representation of G as follows. Writing $\sigma: G \times X \to X$ for the group action, for each g in G and v in V, let

$$\pi(g)v = (\varphi \circ \sigma^*)(v)(g^{-1})$$

where $\sigma^*: V \to \Gamma(G \times X, \sigma^* F)$ and $\varphi: \Gamma(G \times X, \sigma^* F) \overset{\sim}\to \Gamma(G \times X, p_2^* F) = k[G] \otimes_k V$ is the isomorphism given by the equivariant-sheaf structure on F. The cocycle condition then ensures that $\pi: G \to GL(V)$ is a group homomorphism (i.e., $\pi$ is a representation.)

Example: take $X = G, F = \mathcal{O}_G$ and $\sigma=$ the action of G on itself. Then $V = k[G]$, $(\varphi \circ \sigma^*)(f)(g, h) = f(gh)$ and

$$(\pi(g)f)(h) = f(g^{-1} h)$$,

meaning $\pi$ is the left regular representation of G.

The representation $\pi$ defined above is a rational representation: for each vector v in V, there is a finite-dimensional G-submodule of V that contains v.

== Equivariant vector bundle ==
A definition is simpler for a vector bundle (i.e., a variety corresponding to a locally free sheaf of constant rank). We say a vector bundle E on an algebraic variety X acted by an algebraic group G is equivariant if G acts fiberwise: i.e., $g: E_x \to E_{gx}$ is a "linear" isomorphism of vector spaces. In other words, an equivariant vector bundle is a pair consisting of a vector bundle and the lifting of the action $G \times X \to X$ to that of $G \times E \to E$ so that the projection $E \to X$ is equivariant.

Just like in the non-equivariant setting, one can define an equivariant characteristic class of an equivariant vector bundle.

== Examples ==
- The tangent bundle of a manifold or a smooth variety is an equivariant vector bundle.
- The sheaf of equivariant differential forms.
- Let G be a semisimple algebraic group, and λ:H→C a character on a maximal torus H. It extends to a Borel subgroup λ:B→C, giving a one dimensional representation W_{λ} of B. Then GxW_{λ} is a trivial vector bundle over G on which B acts. The quotient L_{λ}=Gx_{B}W_{λ} by the action of B is a line bundle over the flag variety G/B. Note that G→G/B is a B bundle, so this is just an example of the associated bundle construction. The Borel–Weil–Bott theorem says that all representations of G arise as the cohomologies of such line bundles.
- If X=Spec(A) is an affine scheme, a G_{m}-action on X is the same thing as a Z grading on A. Similarly, a G_{m} equivariant quasicoherent sheaf on X is the same thing as a Z graded A module.

== See also ==
- Equivariant algebraic K-theory
- Equivariant bundle
- Equivariant cohomology
- Quotient stack
