= Isotropy representation =

Linear representation of a group on the tangent space to a fixed point of the group

In differential geometry, the isotropy representation is a natural linear representation of a Lie group, that is acting on a manifold, on the tangent space to a fixed point.

== Construction ==
Given a Lie group action $(G, \sigma)$ on a manifold M, if G_{o} is the stabilizer of a point o (isotropy subgroup at o), then, for each g in G_{o}, $\sigma_g: M \to M$ fixes o and thus taking the derivative at o gives the map $(d\sigma_g)_o: T_o M \to T_o M.$ By the chain rule,

$$(d \sigma_{gh})_o = d (\sigma_g \circ \sigma_h)_o = (d \sigma_g)_o \circ (d \sigma_h)_o$$

and thus there is a representation:

$$\rho: G_o \to \operatorname{GL}(T_o M)$$

given by

$$\rho(g) = (d \sigma_g)_o$$.

It is called the isotropy representation at o. For example, if $\sigma$ is a conjugation action of G on itself, then the isotropy representation $\rho$ at the identity element e is the adjoint representation of $G = G_e$.
