= GKM variety =

In algebraic geometry, a GKM variety is a complex algebraic variety equipped with a torus action that meets certain conditions. The concept was introduced by Mark Goresky, Robert Kottwitz, and Robert MacPherson in 1998. The torus action of a GKM variety must be skeletal: both the set of fixed points of the action, and the number of one-dimensional orbits of the action, must be finite. In addition, the action must be equivariantly formal, a condition that can be phrased in terms of the torus' rational cohomology.

== See also ==
- equivariant cohomology
