= Duistermaat–Heckman formula =

In mathematics, the Duistermaat–Heckman formula, due to Duistermaat and Heckman (1982), states that the pushforward of the canonical (Liouville) measure on a symplectic manifold under the moment map is a piecewise polynomial measure. Equivalently, the Fourier transform of the canonical measure is given exactly by the stationary phase approximation.

Berline & Vergne (1982) and, independently, Atiyah & Bott (1984) showed how to deduce the Duistermaat–Heckman formula from a localization theorem for equivariant cohomology.
