= Hans Duistermaat =

Dutch mathematician (1942–2010)

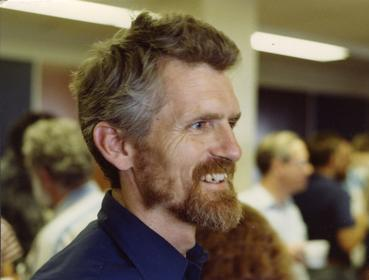
- Duistermaat in Berkeley (1981)
- Born: December 20, 1942; The Hague
- Died: March 19, 2010 (aged 67); Utrecht, Netherlands
- Education: University of Utrecht
- Known for: Duistermaat–Heckman formula
- Scientific career
- Fields: Mathematics
- Workplaces: University of Utrecht
- Thesis: Energy and Entropy as Real Morphisms for Addition and Order (1968)
- Doctoral advisor: Hans Freudenthal
- Doctoral students: Henk Broer; Gert Heckman; Michael Ruzhansky

Johannes Jisse (Hans) Duistermaat (The Hague, December 20, 1942 – Utrecht, March 19, 2010) was a Dutch mathematician.

== Biography ==
Duistermaat attended primary school in Jakarta, at the time the capital of the Dutch East Indies, where his family moved after the end of World War II. In 1957, a few years after the Indonesian independence, they came back to the Netherlands and Duistermaat completed his high school studies in Vlaardingen.

From 1959 to 1965 he studied mathematics at Utrecht University, and he obtained his PhD degree at the same institution in 1968, with a thesis on the mathematical structures of thermodynamics entitled "Energy and Entropy as Real Morphisms for Addition and Order". His original supervisor was the applied mathematician Günther K. Braun, who died one year before the thesis defense, so the official supervision was taken over by geometer Hans Freudenthal.

After a postdoctoral stay in Lund (1969–70), Duistermaat returned to the Netherlands in 1971 and became in 1972 full professor in Nijmegen. In 1974 he returned to Utrecht, where he was offered the chair of Freudenthal.

In 2004 he was awarded a special academy professorship by the KNAW, allowing him to focus exclusively on research, even after his official retirement in 2007. He died in March 2010, due to non-Hodgkin lymphoma and pneumonia.

He was elected a member of the Royal Netherlands Academy of Arts and Sciences in 1982, and of Academia Europaea in 1993. In 2007 he became a Knight of the Order of the Netherlands Lion.

Apart from being an eminent mathematician, Duistermaat was also a chess player. In a simultaneous match of 10 against Anatoly Karpov in 1977, Duistermaat was the only one who did not lose.

== Research ==
Duistermaat defined himself a geometric analyst, but his research covered many different areas in analysis, geometry and mathematical physics, including classical mechanics, symplectic geometry, Fourier integral operators, partial differential equations, algebraic geometry, harmonic analysis, and dynamical systems.

Duistermaat dropped thermodynamics after his PhD, due to dissents between mathematicians and physicists in Utrecht. Nevertheless, during his PhD research he read the work by Sophus Lie, and in particular encountered contact transformations. These topics exerted an important influence for his future pioneering works in microlocal analysis, most prominently during his collaboration with Lars Hörmander, when they developed the theory of Fourier integral operators and proved the Propagation of singularities theorem. This led him also to the work with Victor Guillemin on the link between spectra of elliptic operators and periodic bicharacteristics.

Duistermaat introduced the notion of monodromy in Hamiltonian systems as obstruction to the existence of global action-angle coordinates, later, together with Richard Cushman, he extended it to the quantum systems.

In symplectic geometry he is well known for his article with his PhD student Gert Heckman on the Duistermaat–Heckman formula, which will later be placed in the more general framework of equivariant cohomology, independently by Berline and Vergne and by Atiyah and Bott. Other contributions in this field include a generalisation of the Morse index theorem and a contribution to the problem of quantisation commutes with reduction.

In his book on Lie groups, together with his PhD student Johan Kolk, he provided an alternative proof of the third Lie theorem, which will turn out to be crucial for proving the analogous theorem for Lie groupoids and for its applications to Poisson geometry.

His work with Alberto Grünbaum on the bispectral problem was influential for integrable systems and noncommutative algebraic geometry. In the last stages of his life he became interested in algebraic geometry and wrote a book on QRT maps and elliptic surfaces.

Duistermaat contributed also to applied mathematics. He was a consultant to Royal Dutch Shell, which led to the thesis of Christiaan Stolk on the inversion of seismic data. He also worked on barrier functions in convex programming, collaborated with biomedical technologists on computer vision and with geophysicists on modeling the polarity reversals of the Earth's magnetic field.

He supervised 25 PhD students.

== Selected works ==
- Duistermaat, J. J. (2011) [1996], Fourier integral operators, Modern Birkhäuser Classics, Birkhäuser/Springer, New York, doi:10.1007/978-0-8176-8108-1, ISBN 978-0-8176-8107-4, MR 1362544
- Duistermaat, J. J. (2011), The heat kernel Lefschetz fixed point formula for the Spin^{c} dirac operator, Boston: Birkhäuser, ISBN 978-0-8176-8247-7; Duistermaat, J. J. (1996). 1st edition. Birkhäuser Boston. ISBN 0-8176-3865-2.
- Duistermaat, J. J.; Guillemin, V. W. (1975), "The spectrum of positive elliptic operators and periodic bicharacteristics" (PDF), Inventiones Mathematicae, 29 (1): 39–79, Bibcode:1975InMat..29...39D, doi:10.1007/BF01405172, hdl:10338.dmlcz/126178, MR 0405514, S2CID 189832135
- Duistermaat, J. J.; Heckman, G. J. (1982), "On the variation in the cohomology of the symplectic form of the reduced phase space", Inventiones Mathematicae, 69 (2): 259–268, Bibcode:1982InMat..69..259D, doi:10.1007/BF01399506, MR 0674406, S2CID 119943006
- Duistermaat, J. J.; Grünbaum, F. A. (1986), "Differential equations in the spectral parameter", Communications in Mathematical Physics, 103 (2): 177–240, Bibcode:1986CMaPh.103..177D, doi:10.1007/bf01206937, MR 0826863, S2CID 121915958
