= Measurable acting group =

In mathematics, a measurable acting group is a special group that acts on some space in a way that is compatible with structures of measure theory. Measurable acting groups are found in the intersection of measure theory and group theory, two sub-disciplines of mathematics. Measurable acting groups are the basis for the study of invariant measures in abstract settings, most famously the Haar measure, and the study of stationary random measures.

== Definition ==
Let $(G, \mathcal G, \circ)$ be a measurable group, where $\mathcal G$ denotes the $\sigma$-algebra on $G$ and $\circ$ the group law. Let further $(S, \mathcal S)$ be a measurable space and let $\mathcal A \otimes \mathcal B$ be the product $\sigma$-algebra of the $\sigma$-algebras $\mathcal A$ and $\mathcal B$.

Let $G$ act on $S$ with group action

$$\Phi \colon G \times S \to S$$

If $\Phi$ is a measurable function from $\mathcal G \otimes \mathcal S$ to $\mathcal S$, then it is called a measurable group action. In this case, the group $G$ is said to act measurably on $S$.

== Example: Measurable groups as measurable acting groups ==
One special case of measurable acting groups are measurable groups themselves. If $S=G$, and the group action is the group law, then a measurable group is a group $G$, acting measurably on $G$.
