= Helen F. Cullen =

American mathematician

Helen Frances Cullen (January 4, 1919 – August 25, 2007) was an American mathematician specializing in topology. She worked for many years as a professor of mathematics at the University of Massachusetts Amherst and was the first female faculty member in the mathematics department at Amherst. She was known as the author of the book Introduction to General Topology (Heath, 1968), as well as for her outspoken antisemitism.

== Education and career ==
Cullen was born in Dorchester, Massachusetts, and studied at Girls' Latin School and Radcliffe College. She earned a master's degree at the University of Michigan in 1944, and completed her Ph.D. at Michigan in 1950. Her dissertation, A Set of Parabolic Regular Curve Families Filling the Plane and Certain Related Reimann Surfaces, was supervised by Wilfred Kaplan. She was a faculty member in the department of mathematics at Amherst from 1949 until her retirement as a professor emerita in 1992.

== Recognition ==
In 1998 the Girls' Latin School – Boston Latin Academy Association listed her as one of their outstanding alumnae.
