= Stephen Halperin =

Canadian mathematician (born 1942)

John Stephen Halperin (born 1 February 1942 in Kingston, Ontario) is a Canadian mathematician who deals with differential geometry and algebraic topology.

A son of the mathematician Israel Halperin, Stephen Halperin studied at the University of Toronto with a bachelor's degree in 1966 and a master's degree in 1967. He received in 1970 his PhD from Cornell University under the supervision of Hsien Chung Wang with thesis Real Cohomology and Smooth Transformation Groups. He then became an assistant professor and in 1979 a full professor at the University of Toronto.

Halperin was a visiting scholar in 1981 at the University of Bonn, in 1986 at the University of Nice, and in 1995 at the University of Lille.

His research deals with homotopy theory and homology of loop spaces with applications in geometry. He wrote a three-volume textbook on differential geometry with Werner H. Greub and Ray Vanstone.

In 1984 Halperin was elected a Fellow of the Royal Society of Canada. In 1997 he received the Jeffery–Williams Prize.

In 1999 he became a full professor at the University of Maryland, College Park, where he served as the dean of the College of Computer, Mathematical and Physical Sciences.

== Selected publications ==
- with Ray Vanstone and Werner H. Greub: Connections, Curvature and Cohomology , 3 volumes (Volume 1: De Rham Cohomology of Manifolds and Vector Bundles, Volume 2 Lie Groups, Principal Bundles and Characteristic Classes, Volume 3 Cohomology of principal bundles and homogeneous spaces), Academic Press 1972, 1973, 1976
- with Yves Félix: Rational L.-S. category and its applications , Transactions of the American Mathematical Society, vol. 273, 1982, 1–38
- with Karsten Grove: Contributions of rational homotopy theory to global problems in geometry , Publications Mathématiques de l'IHÉS, vol. 56, 1982, 171–177 doi:10.1007/BF02700465
- Lectures on minimal models, Mémoires de la Société Mathématique de France, 2^{e} série, tome 9–10, 1983, 1–261
- with Yves Félix and Jean-Claude Thomas: Differential graded algebras in topology, in I.M. James (editor) Handbook in Algebraic Topology , Elsevier Science 1995, Chapter 16, pp. 829–865.
- with Yves Félix and Jean-Claude Thomas: Rational Homotopy Theory, Graduate Texts in Mathematics, Springer Verlag 2001
