= Equivariant differential form =

In differential geometry, an equivariant differential form on a manifold M acted upon by a Lie group G is a polynomial map

$$\alpha: \mathfrak{g} \to \Omega^*(M)$$

from the Lie algebra $\mathfrak{g} = \operatorname{Lie}(G)$ to the space of differential forms on M that are equivariant; i.e.,

$$\alpha(\operatorname{Ad}(g)X) = g\alpha(X).$$

In other words, an equivariant differential form is an invariant element of

$$\mathbb{C}[\mathfrak{g}] \otimes \Omega^*(M) = \operatorname{Sym}(\mathfrak{g}^*) \otimes \Omega^*(M).$$

For an equivariant differential form $\alpha$, the equivariant exterior derivative $d_\mathfrak{g} \alpha$ of $\alpha$ is defined by

$$(d_\mathfrak{g} \alpha)(X) = d(\alpha(X)) - i_{X^\#}(\alpha(X))$$

where d is the usual exterior derivative and $i_{X^\#}$ is the interior product by the fundamental vector field generated by X. It is easy to see $d_\mathfrak{g} \circ d_\mathfrak{g} = 0$ (use the fact the Lie derivative of $\alpha(X)$ along $X^\#$ is zero) and one then puts

$$H^*_G(M) = \ker d_\mathfrak{g}/\operatorname{im} d_\mathfrak{g} ,$$

which is called the equivariant cohomology of M (which coincides with the ordinary equivariant cohomology defined in terms of Borel construction.) The definition is due to H. Cartan. The notion has an application to the equivariant index theory.

$d_\mathfrak{g}$-closed or $d_\mathfrak{g}$-exact forms are called equivariantly closed or equivariantly exact.

The integral of an equivariantly closed form may be evaluated from its restriction to the fixed point by means of the localization formula.
