= Bredon cohomology =

The Bredon cohomology, introduced by Glen E. Bredon, is a type of equivariant cohomology that is a contravariant functor from the category of $G$-complexes with equivariant homotopy maps to the category of abelian groups together with the connecting homomorphism satisfying some conditions.
