= Cartan model =

Differential graded algebra

In mathematics, the Cartan model is a differential graded algebra that computes the equivariant cohomology of a space.
