= Descent along torsors =

Algebraic geometry

In mathematics, given a G-torsor X → Y and a stack F, the descent along torsors says there is a canonical equivalence between F(Y), the category of Y-points and F(X)^{G}, the category of G-equivariant X-points. It is a basic example of descent, since it says the "equivariant data" (which is an additional data) allows one to "descend" from X to Y.

When G is the Galois group of a finite Galois extension L/K, for the G-torsor $\operatorname{Spec}L \to \operatorname{Spec}K$, this generalizes classical Galois descent (cf. field of definition).

For example, one can take F to be the stack of quasi-coherent sheaves (in an appropriate topology). Then F(X)^{G} consists of equivariant sheaves on X; thus, the descent in this case says that to give an equivariant sheaf on X is to give a sheaf on the quotient X/G.
