= Measurable group =

In mathematics, a measurable group is a special type of group in the intersection between group theory and measure theory. Measurable groups are used to study measures is an abstract setting and are often closely related to topological groups.

== Definition ==
Let $(G, \circ)$ a group with group law

$$\circ : G \times G \to G$$.

Let further $\mathcal G$ be a σ-algebra of subsets of the set $G$.

The group, or more formally the triple $(G,\circ,\mathcal G)$ is called a measurable group if

- the inversion $g \mapsto g^{-1}$ is measurable from $\mathcal G$ to $\mathcal G$.
- the group law $(g_1, g_2) \mapsto g_1 \circ g_2$ is measurable from $\mathcal G \otimes \mathcal G$ to $\mathcal G$

Here, $\mathcal A \otimes \mathcal B$ denotes the formation of the product σ-algebra of the σ-algebras $\mathcal A$ and $\mathcal B$.

== Topological groups as measurable groups ==
Every second-countable topological group $(G, \mathcal O)$ can be taken as a measurable group. This is done by equipping the group with the Borel σ-algebra

$$\mathcal B(G)= \sigma(\mathcal O)$$,

which is the σ-algebra generated by the topology. Since by definition of a topological group, the group law and the formation of the inverse element is continuous, both operations are in this case also measurable from $\mathcal B(G)$ to $\mathcal B(G)$ and from $\mathcal B(G\times G)$ to $\mathcal B(G)$, respectively. Second countability ensures that $\mathcal B(G)\otimes \mathcal B(G) = \mathcal B(G\times G)$, and therefore the group $G$ is also a measurable group.

== Related concepts ==
Measurable groups can be seen as measurable acting groups that act on themselves.
