= George Roger Sell =

American mathematician (1937-2015)

George Roger Sell (February 7, 1937 – May 29, 2015) was an American mathematician, specializing in differential equations, dynamical systems, and applications to fluid dynamics, climate modeling, control systems, and other subjects.

== Biography ==
Sell was born in Milwaukee, Wisconsin. He received in 1957 his bachelor's degree and in 1958 his M.Sc. from Marquette University and in 1962 his Ph.D. from the University of Michigan with thesis under the direction of Wilfred Kaplan and Lamberto Cesari. The mathematics department there awarded him the Sumner B. Myers Prize for the year's best doctoral dissertation submitted to the department. As a graduate student, Sell held a recurring summer job at the AC Spark Plug Division of AC Delco, working on the guidance system for Titan rockets. He was a Benjamin Peirce instructor from 1962 to 1964 at Harvard University. He was from 1964 to 1968 an assistant professor, from 1968 to 1973 an associate, and from 1973 until retirement a full professor at the University of Minnesota. From 1982 to 1987 Sell was the associate director of the Institute for Mathematics and its Applications. From 1984 to 1994 he was the director of the Army High Performance Computing Research Center at the University of Minnesota campus. He was a visiting professor on sabbatical at various institutions, including the University of Southern California and the University of Florence, where he worked with Roberto Conti. Sell was the author or coauthor of more than 120 publication in refereed journals.

In 1983 he was an Invited Speaker at the ICM in Warsaw. In 1988 he was the founding editor-in-chief of the Journal of Dynamics and Differential Equations. In 1990 Leningrad State University awarded him an honorary doctorate, who was the fifth foreigner given that particular distinction. In July 2002 Spain's University of Valladolid sponsored a conference in his honor at Medina del Campo. In 2012 he was elected a Fellow of the American Mathematical Society.

His pioneering work in the 1960s on the topological-dynamics formalism of a nonautonomous differential equation established a deep connection between the coefficient space and the solution space. This remarkable discovery of George completely changed the classical view of nonautonomous dynamics and has become a standard approach for the study of many intriguing time-dependent phenomena in nature. His series of works with Robert J. Sacker in the 1970s and 1980s on dynamical spectra introduced a very important characteristic and a fundamental theory into the study of linear skew-product flows. This theory, now widely regarded as the Sacker–Sell spectral theory, has led to a number of active major research areas in dynamical systems in the past three decades. His work from the 1990s on inertial manifolds, global attractors, fluids, and climate modeling brought many innovative ideas into the study of infinite-dimensional dynamical systems.

Upon his death he was survived by his wife, six children, and several grandchildren.

== Selected publications ==
=== Articles ===
- "A note on the fundamental theory of ordinary differential equations," Bull. Amer. Math. Soc. 70 (1964): 529–535 doi:10.1090/S0002-9904-1964-11185-X
- "Almost periodic and periodic solutions of difference equations," Bull. Amer. Math. Soc. 72 (1966): 261–265 doi:10.1090/S0002-9904-1966-11487-8
- "Nonautonomous differential equations as dynamical systems: I and II," Trans. Amer. Math. Soc. 127 (1967); I. The basic theory, 214–262 doi:10.1090/S0002-9947-1967-0212313-2; II. Limiting equations, 263–283 doi:10.1090/S0002-9947-1967-0212314-4
- with Wayne W. Schmaedeke: "The Gronwall inequality for modified Stieltjes integrals," Proc. Amer. Math. Soc. 19 (1968): 1217–1222 doi:10.1090/S0002-9939-1968-0230864-8
- with L. Markus: "Control in conservative dynamical systems. Recurrence and capture in aperiodic fields," J. Differential Equations 16 (1974): 472–505. doi:10.1016/0022-0396(74)90005-9
- with R. J. Sacker: "Finite extensions of minimal transformation groups," Trans. Amer. Math. Soc. 190 (1974): 429–458 doi:10.1090/S0002-9947-1974-0350715-8
- with R. J. Sacker: "A note on Anosov diffeomorphisms," Bull. Amer. Math. Soc. 80 (1974): 278–280 doi:10.1090/S0002-9904-1974-13460-9
- "A remark on an example of R. A. Johnson," Proc. Amer. Math. Soc. 82 (1981): 206–208 doi:10.1090/S0002-9939-1981-0609652-2
- with K. R. Meyer: "Melnikov transformations, Bernoulli bundles and almost periodic perturbations," Trans. Amer. Math. Soc. 314 (1989): 63–105. doi:10.1090/S0002-9947-1989-0954601-2
- with J. Mallet-Paret: "Inertial manifolds for reaction-diffusion equations in higher space dimensions," J. Amer. Math. Soc. 1 (1988): 805–866. doi:10.1090/S0894-0347-1988-0943276-7
- with G. Raugel: "Navier-Stokes equations on thin 3D domains I: Global attractors and global regularity of solutions," J. Amer. Math. Soc. 6 (1993): 503–568. doi:10.1090/S0894-0347-1993-1179539-4

=== Books ===
- with Richard K. Miller: Miller, Richard K.; Sell, George R. (1970). Volterra integral equations and topological dynamics. Memoirs of the American Mathematical Society, no. 102. ISBN 9780821818022; 67 pp.
- Topological dynamics and ordinary differential equations. 1971; 199 pp.
- with R. J. Sacker: Sacker, Robert J.; Sell, George R. (1977). Lifting properties in skew-product flows with applications to differential equations. Memoirs Amer. Math. Soc., no. 190. ISBN 9780821821909.
- with A. W. Naylor: Linear operator theory in engineering and science. Applied mathematical sciences vol. 40. Springer. 1982. Naylor, Arch W.; Sell, George R. (2000-02-23). 2000 reprint. Springer. ISBN 9780387950013; pbk
- with Ciprian Foiaș and Roger Temam: Turbulence in flows: a dynamical systems approach. IMA volumes in mathematics and its applications, vol. 55. Springer-Verlag. 1993. ISBN 9780387941134.
- with Yuncheng You: Dynamics of evolutionary equations. Applied mathematical sciences, vol. 143. Springer. 2002. ISBN 9780387983479.
