= William M. Boothby =

American mathematician (1918–2021)

- Born: April 1, 1918; Detroit
- Died: February 14, 2021 (aged 102); Nashville
- Known for: Boothby-Wang construction
- Scientific career
- Fields: Mathematics
- Workplaces: Washington University in St. Louis; Northwestern University
- Thesis: A Topological Study of the Level Curves of Harmonic Functions (1949)
- Doctoral advisor: Wilfred Kaplan

William Munger Boothby (April 1, 1918 – February 14, 2021) was an American mathematician and professor emeritus of mathematics at Arts and Sciences at Washington University in St. Louis, known for his work in differential geometry including the book An introduction to differentiable manifolds and Riemannian geometry (1975; 2nd ed. 1986).

== Education and career ==
Boothby was originally from Detroit. He received a six-year scholarship to attend the Cranbrook Academy in Bloomfield Hills, and completed a degree at the University of Michigan in 1940. His graduate studies in mathematics were interrupted by World War II; he became a pilot for the United States Army Air Forces between 1942 and 1945.

He would complete a PhD at University of Michigan in 1949. His dissertation, A Topological Study of the Level Curves of Harmonic Functions, was supervised by Wilfred Kaplan.

He then joined as junior faculty Northwestern University. A one-year fellowship at ETH Zurich followed in 1950-51. He joined as a professor the Mathematics Department at the Washington University in St. Louis, until his retirement in 1988. In 1960-61 he visited the Institute for Advanced Study.

== Research ==
His early research concerned differential geometry, including harmonic functions, Hermitian manifolds and contact structures. In particular, he worked on contact manifolds together with Hsien Chung Wang, describing what is now known as the Boothby-Wang construction.

In 1975 he published a very popular textbook, An Introduction to Differentiable Manifolds and Riemannian Geometry, which "defined the curriculum and standard of the introductory graduate differential geometry course worldwide".

After publishing this book, his research interests shifted to control theory.
