= Isabel Dotti =

Argentine mathematician

Isabel Graciela Dotti de Miatello (born 1947) is an Argentine mathematician specializing in the connections between group theory and differential topology, including the theory of complex nilmanifolds, nilpotent Lie groups, hypercomplex manifolds, and hyperkähler manifolds. She is a professor in the Faculty of Mathematics, Astronomy and Physics of the National University of Córdoba.

== Education and career ==
Dotti was born on 21 June 1947 in Freyre, a town in San Justo Department, Córdoba. She earned a bachelor's degree in mathematics in 1970 at the National University of Córdoba, and completed a doctorate at Rutgers University in the United States in 1976. Her dissertation, Extension of Actions on Stiefel Manifolds, was supervised by Glen Bredon.

After temporary positions at the Federal University of Pernambuco in Brazil, at Rutgers, and at the National University of Córdoba, she obtained a permanent faculty position at the National University of Córdoba in 1983.

== Recognition ==
Dotti is a numbered member of the National Academy of Sciences of Argentina, elected in 2007.
