= Continuous group action =

In topology, a continuous group action is a group action adapted to the topological setting: $G$ is a topological group, $X$ is a topological space, and the action map is continuous.

== Definition ==
Let

$$\Phi: G \times X \to X, \quad (g, x) \mapsto g \cdot x$$

be a (left) group action of a topological group on a topological space; it is called a continuous group action if the map $\Phi$ is continuous (with respect to the product topology on $G \times X$). A topological space endowed with a continuous group action is also called a $G$-space.

=== Properties ===
A continuous action is automatically an action by homeomorphisms, i.e. the bijections $\Phi_g = \Phi (g, \cdot): X \to X$ are homeomorphisms for every $g \in G$, but the converse is not necessarily true. However, if $G$ is discrete, these two concepts coincide.

Given a $G$-space, the quotient map $X \to X/G$ is an open map (with respect to the quotient topology on $X/G$).

== Constructions ==
If $f: H \to G$ is a continuous group homomorphism of topological groups, and if $X$ is a $G$-space, then $H$ acts on $X$ by restriction: $h \cdot x = f(h) x$, making $X$ a $H$-space. Often $f$ is either an inclusion or a quotient map. In particular, any topological space may be thought of as a $G$-space via $G \to 1$ (and $G$ would act trivially).

Two basic operations are that of taking the space of points fixed by a subgroup $H$ and that of forming a quotient by $H$. We write $X^H$ for the set of all $x$ in $X$ such that $hx = x$. For example, if we write $F(X, Y)$ for the set of continuous maps from a $G$-space $X$ to another $G$-space $Y$, then, with the action $(g \cdot f)(x) = g f(g^{-1} x)$, $F(X, Y)^G$ consists of $f$ such that $f(g x) = g f(x)$; i.e., $f$ is an equivariant map. We write $F_G(X, Y) = F(X, Y)^G$. Note, for example, for a $G$-space $X$ and a closed subgroup $H$, $F_G(G/H, X) = X^H$.

== See also ==
- Lie group action
