= Merlin (assembler) =

- Developer: Glen Bredon
- Operating system: Apple DOS 3.3, ProDOS
- Platform: Apple II, Apple IIGS, Commodore 64 Commodore 128
- Available in: English
- Type: Macro assembler
- License: Public domain software

Merlin is a MOS Technology 6502 macro assembler developed by mathematics professor Glen Bredon for the Apple II under DOS 3.3. It was published commercially by Southwestern Data Systems, later known as Roger Wagner Publishing. Merlin continued to be updated as successors to the 6502 became available: first the 65C02 and later the 65816 and 65802. A ProDOS version was made available as Merlin Pro (this package also included the DOS 3.3 version). The 8-bit version of Merlin was later renamed Merlin 8, and a 16-bit version, dubbed Merlin 16, was released for the Apple IIGS. Versions for the Commodore 64 and Commodore 128 were released as Merlin 64 and Merlin 128 respectively.

According to early Merlin documentation, "Merlin is a 'TED-based' editor-assembler. This means that while it is essentially new from the ground up, it adheres to and follows almost all of the conventions associated with TED ][+, in terms of command mnemonics, pseudo-op's, etc. ... The original TED ASM was written by Randy Wiggington and Gary Shannon."

Merlin includes an integrated source code editor (initially a line editor; later versions include a full-screen editor) and also a disassembler, called Sourceror. A related utility, Sourceror.FP, can generate a commented disassembly of the Apple II's Applesoft BASIC, the source code for which had never been released by Apple, from the customer's own ROM.

== Reception ==
Ahoy! called Merlin 64 "an excellent little assembler with many value added features. For ease of use, I couldn't imagine how it could be better ... an outstanding value".

== Legacy ==
On August 24, 2000, what would have been the author's 68th birthday, his widow released all of his Apple II software and source code (e.g. DOS.MASTER) as public domain software.

In January, 2015 a Windows edition of Merlin titled "Merlin 32" was released by Brutal Deluxe.
