= Glen Bredon =

American mathematician (1932–2000)

Glen Eugene Bredon
- Born: August 24, 1932; Fresno, California, United States
- Died: May 8, 2000 (aged 67); North Fork, California
- Education: Stanford University; Harvard University
- Known for: Bredon cohomology Merlin (assembler)
- Spouse: Anne Bredon
- Scientific career
- Workplaces: University of California, Berkeley; Rutgers University
- Thesis: Some theorems on transformation groups (1958)
- Doctoral advisor: Andrew M. Gleason
- Doctoral students: Isabel Dotti

Glen Eugene Bredon (August 24, 1932 – May 8, 2000) was an American mathematician who worked in the area of topology.

== Education and career ==
Bredon received a bachelor's degree from Stanford University in 1954 and a master's degree from Harvard University in 1955. In 1958, he wrote his PhD thesis at Harvard (Some theorems on transformation groups) under the supervision of Andrew M. Gleason. Starting in 1960, he worked as a professor at the University of California, Berkeley and since 1969 at Rutgers University, until he retired in 1993, after which he moved to North Fork, California.

From 1958 to 1960 and 1966/67 he was at the Institute for Advanced Study.

The Bredon cohomology of topological spaces under action of a topological group is named after him.

In the late 1980s, he wrote the program DOS.MASTER for Apple II computers. He is the author of the programs Merlin (a macro assembler) and ProSel for Apple machines.

== Personal life ==
In 1963, while at Berkeley, he married folk singer Anne Bredon (née Loeb), with whom he had two children, Aaron and Joelle.

== Software ==
Bredon is the author of the programs Merlin (a macro assembler) and ProSel for Apple machines.

DOS.MASTER (also: DOS Master) is a program for Apple II computers which allows Apple DOS 3.3 programs to be placed on a hard drive or 3½" floppy disk and run from ProDOS. Bredon wrote it as a commercial program during the late 1980s where it experienced widespread success; it was released into the public domain by his family after the author's death.

DOS.MASTER was created as a result of Apple Computer's abandonment of the DOS 3.3 operating system and its subsequent replacement by ProDOS. Apple provided a program to copy files from DOS 3.3 volumes to new ProDOS volumes; however, programs written for DOS 3.3 did not run on ProDOS volumes. DOS.MASTER enabled a widely installed base of previously ProDOS incompatible programs written for DOS 3.3 to be run under ProDOS. DOS.MASTER took a large ProDOS partition, formatted it as a file, and then created a series of DOS 3.3 volumes within that file. The program allowed the user to create one of four DOS 3.3 volume sizes: 140 KB (the standard capacity of an Apple II 5¼" floppy disk), 160 KB, 200 KB, or 400 KB (the maximum that DOS 3.3 could address). Up to 255 of these volumes could be created on the larger ProDOS partition, space allowing, essentially simulating a very large stack of virtual floppy disk drives.

== Works ==
- Bredon, Glen E. (1958). "Some theorems on transformation groups". Annals of Mathematics. 67 (1): 104–118. doi:10.2307/1969930. JSTOR 1969930. MR 0093559.
- Bredon, Glen E. (1964). "The cohomology ring structure of a fixed point set". Annals of Mathematics. 80 (3): 524–537. doi:10.2307/1970661. JSTOR 1970661. MR 0184225.
- Equivariant Cohomology Theories, Lecture Notes in Mathematics, Springer Verlag, 1967
- Bredon, Glen E.; Wood, John W. (1969). "Non-orientable surfaces in orientable 3-manifolds". Inventiones Mathematicae. 7 (2): 83–110. Bibcode:1969InMat...7...83B. doi:10.1007/BF01389793. MR 0246312. S2CID 123119440.
- Bredon, Glen E. (1969). "Representations at fixed points of smooth actions of compact groups". Annals of Mathematics. 89 (3): 515–532. doi:10.2307/1970649. JSTOR 1970649. MR 0246324.
- Bredon, Glen E. (1972). Introduction to compact transformation groups. Academic Press. ISBN 0-12-128850-1. MR 0413144. OCLC 909309863.
- Bredon, Glen E. (1973). "Fixed point sets of actions on Poincaré duality spaces". Topology. 12 (2): 159–175. doi:10.1016/0040-9383(73)90004-9. MR 0331375.
- Topology and Geometry, Graduate Texts in Mathematics, Springer Verlag 1993, 1996
- Bredon, Glen E. (1997) [1st pub. 1967, McGraw Hill]. Sheaf Theory. Graduate Texts in Mathematics. Vol. 170 (2nd ed.). Berlin, New York: Springer-Verlag. doi:10.1007/978-1-4612-0647-7. ISBN 978-0-387-94905-5. MR 1481706.
