= Hsien Chung Wang =

Chinese-American mathematician

- 王宪钟
- Born: 18 April 1918; Beijing
- Died: 25 June 1978 (aged 60); New York City
- Education: Tsinghua University; Manchester University
- Known for: Wang sequence Boothby-Wang construction
- Scientific career
- Fields: Mathematics
- Workplaces: Academia Sinica; Louisiana State University; Institute for Advanced Study; Alabama Polytechnic Institute; University of Washington in Seattle; Columbia University in New York; Northwestern University; Cornell University
- Thesis: I. Homogeneous spaces with non-vanishing Euler characteristics. II. Simply-connected homogeneous manifolds with prime Euler characteristics (1948)
- Doctoral advisor: Max Newman
- Doctoral students: Stephen Halperin

Hsien Chung (or Hsien-Chung or Hsien-chung) Wang (王宪钟 Wang Xian Zhong; 18 April 1918 in Beijing – 25 June 1978 in New York City) was a Chinese-American mathematician, specializing in differential geometry, Lie groups, and algebraic topology.

== Biography ==
Hsien Chung Wang was part of a family from Shandong Province that had produced distinguished scholars for several generations, including the archeologist Wang Yirong.

He studied in Tianjin at Nankai High School and in 1936 he matriculated at Tsing Hua University in Beijing. Due to the outbreak of the Second Sino-Japanese War in 1937, the university had to be moved to Southwest China. Wang graduated in 1941 and began to study under Chern. He was awarded a master's degree in 1944 and began teaching in a school.

However, after one year, he was awarded a British Council Scholarship to continue his studies in England. He studied first in Sheffield and then at Manchester University under Newman, and received a Ph.D. in 1948.

Returning to China, Wang took a research position at the Academia Sinica, which was soon moved to Taiwan following the end of the Chinese Civil War.

In 1949 Wang moved to the United States, obtaining a lecturer position at Louisiana State University. In the subsequent years, he hold a series of temporary positions at the Institute for Advanced Study at Princeton, the Alabama Polytechnic Institute, the University of Washington in Seattle and Columbia University in New York.

He obtained his first permanent position in 1957 at Northwestern University. In 1966 he accepted a professorship at Cornell University, which he hold until his sudden death from leukemia.

== Research and awards ==
While he was a PhD student in Manchester, Wang worked in algebraic topology. He discovered an exact sequence (called nowadays the Wang sequence) involving the homology groups associated with fiber bundles over spheres.

At the same time, he also solved an open problem arising from the work of Hopf and Samelson: determine the closed subgroups of maximal rank in a compact Lie group. In 1952 he showed that any connected compact metric space, such that any two pairs of points separated by the same distance are related by an isometry, is a homogeneous space of a compact Lie group.

Since 1956 and until the end of his career he worked mostly on discrete subgroups of Lie groups.

Among other topics in differential geometry, he worked on complex manifolds, he described a construction of contact manifolds which is now called the Boothby-Wang construction, and he studied transformation groups of n-spheres.

Wang was an Invited Speaker at the ICM in 1958 in Edinburgh. He was a Guggenheim Fellow for the academic year 1960–1961.

His doctoral students include J. Stephen Halperin.

== Selected publications ==
- with S. S. Chern: "Differential geometry in symplectic space." I, Sci. Rep. Nat. Tsing Hua Univ 4 (1947): 453–477.
- "Axiom of the plane in a general space of paths." Annals of Mathematics (1948): 731–737. doi:10.2307/1969056
- "The homology groups of the fibre-bundles over a sphere." Duke Math. J 16 (1949): 33–38.
- "Homogeneous spaces with non-vanishing Euler characteristics." Annals of Mathematics (1949): 925–953. doi:10.2307/1969588
- "A problem of PA Smith." Proceedings of the American Mathematical Society 1, no. 1 (1950): 18–19. MR 0033288
- "A remark on transformation groups leaving fixed an end point." Proceedings of the American Mathematical Society 3, no. 4 (1952): 548–549. MR 0048803
- "One-dimensional cohomology group of locally compact metrically homogeneous space." Duke Mathematical Journal 19, no. 2 (1952): 303–310. MR 0047672
- "Complex parallisable manifolds." Proceedings of the American Mathematical Society 5, no. 5 (1954): 771–776. MR 0074064
- with Kentaro Yano: "A class of affinely connected spaces." Transactions of the American Mathematical Society 80, no. 1 (1955): 72–92. MR 0073254
- "Discrete subgroups of solvable Lie groups I." Annals of Mathematics (1956): 1–19. doi:10.2307/1969948
- with William M. Boothby: "On contact manifolds." Annals of Mathematics (1958): 721–734. doi:10.2307/1970165
- "Compact transformation groups of S^{n} with an (n–1)-dimensional orbit." American Journal of Mathematics 82, no. 4 (1960): 698–748. doi:10.2307/2372936
- with Samuel Pasiencier: "Commutators in a semi-simple Lie group." Proceedings of the American Mathematical Society 13, no. 6 (1962): 907–913. MR 0169947
- "On the deformations of lattice in a Lie group." American Journal of Mathematics 85, no. 2 (1963): 189–212. doi:10.2307/2373209
- with William M. Boothby and Shoshichi Kobayashi: "A note on mappings and automorphisms of almost complex manifolds." Annals of Mathematics (1963): 329–334. doi:10.2307/1970219
- "A remark on co-compactness of transformation groups." American Journal of Mathematics 95, no. 4 (1973): 885–903. doi:10.2307/2373700
