= Monomial ideal =

Ideal generated by one-term polynomials

In abstract algebra, a monomial ideal is an ideal generated by monomials in a multivariate polynomial ring over a field.

== Definitions and properties ==
Let $\mathbb{K}$ be a field and $R = \mathbb{K}[x]$ be the polynomial ring over $\mathbb{K}$ with n indeterminates $x = x_1, x_2, \dotsc, x_n$.

A monomial in $R$ is a product $x^{\alpha} = x_1^{\alpha_1} x_2^{\alpha_2} \cdots x_n^{\alpha_n}$ for an n-tuple $\alpha = (\alpha_1, \alpha_2, \dotsc, \alpha_n) \in \mathbb{N}^n$ of nonnegative integers.

The following three conditions are equivalent for an ideal $I \subseteq R$:

1. $I$ is generated by monomials,
2. If $f = \sum_{\alpha \in \mathbb{N}^n} c_{\alpha} x^{\alpha} \in I$, then $x^{\alpha} \in I$, provided that $c_{\alpha}$ is nonzero.
3. $I$ is torus fixed, i.e., given $(c_1, c_2, \dotsc, c_n) \in (\mathbb{K}^*)^n$, then $I$ is fixed under the action $f(x_i) = c_i x_i$ for all $i$.

We say that $I \subseteq \mathbb{K}[x]$ is a monomial ideal if it satisfies any of these equivalent conditions.

Given a monomial ideal $I = (m_1, m_2, \dotsc, m_k)$, $f \in \mathbb{K}[x_1, x_2, \dotsc, x_n]$ is in $I$ if and only if every monomial term of $f$ is a multiple of one of the $m_j$.

Proof: Suppose that $f \in \mathbb{K}[x_1, x_2, \dotsc, x_n]$ is in $I$. Then $f = f_1m_1 + f_2m_2 + \dotsm + f_km_k$, for some $f_i \in \mathbb{K}[x_1, x_2, \dotsc, x_n]$. For all $1 \leqslant i \leqslant k$, we can express each $f_i$ as the sum of monomials, so that every monomial of $f$ will be a multiple of at least one $m_i$.

Conversely, let each monomial term in $f \in \mathbb{K} [x_1, x_2, . . . , x_n]$ be a multiple of one of the $m_i$ in $I$. Grouping the multiples of each $m_i$, $f$ can be written as $f = c_1m_1 + c_2m_2 + \dotsm + c_km_k$ for some $c_i \in \mathbb{K}[x_1, x_2, \dotsc, x_n]$; as a result $f \in I$.

The following illustrates an example of monomial and polynomial ideals.

Let $I = (xyz, y^2)$ then the polynomial $x^2 yz + 3xy^2$ is in I, since each term is a multiple of an element in J, i.e., they can be rewritten as $x^2 yz = x(xyz)$ and $3xy^2 = 3x(y^2),$ both in I. However, if $J = (xz^2, y^2)$, then this polynomial $x^2 yz + 3xy^2$ is not in J, since its terms are not multiples of elements in J.

== Monomial ideals and Young diagrams ==
Bivariate monomial ideals can be interpreted as Young diagrams.

Let $I$ be a monomial ideal in $I \subset k[x, y],$ where $k$ is a field. The ideal $I$ has a unique minimal generating set of $I$ of the form $\{x^{a_1}y^{b_1}, x^{a_2}y^{b_2},\ldots, x^{a_k}y^{b_k}\}$, where $a_1 > a_2 > \dotsm > a_k \geq 0$ and $b_k > \dotsm > b_2 > b_1 \geq 0$. The monomials in $I$ are those monomials $x^ay^b$ such that there exists $i$ such $a_i\le a$ and $b_i\le b.$ If a monomial $x^ay^b$ is represented by the point $(a,b)$ in the plane, the figure formed by the monomials in $I$ is often called the staircase of $I,$ because of its shape. In this figure, the minimal generators form the inner corners of a Young diagram.

The monomials not in $I$ lie below the staircase, and form a vector space basis of the quotient ring $k[x, y]/I$.

For example, consider the monomial ideal $I = (x^3, x^2y, y^3) \subset k[x, y].$ The set of grid points $S = {\{(3, 0), (2, 1),(0, 3)}\}$ corresponds to the minimal monomial generators $x^3y^0, x^2y^1, x^0y^3.$ Then as the figure shows, the pink Young diagram consists of the monomials that are not in $I$. The points in the inner corners of the Young diagram allow us to identify the minimal monomials $x^0y^3, x^2y^1, x^3y^0$ in $I$ as seen in the green boxes. Hence, $I = (y^3, x^2y, x^3)$.

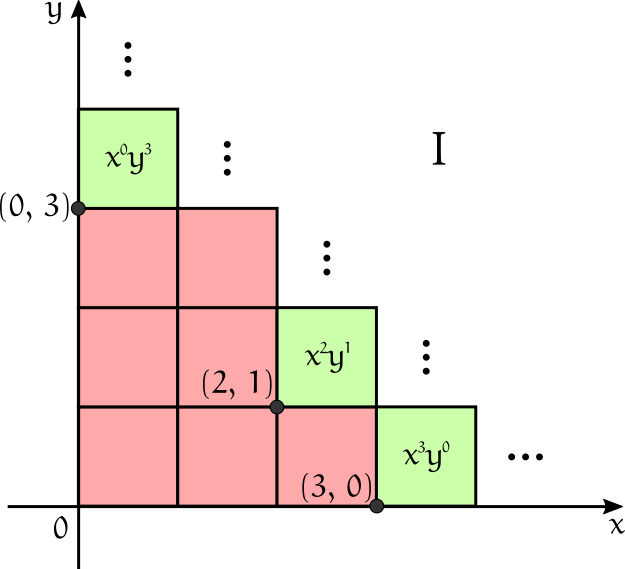
A Young diagram and its connection with its monomial ideal.

In general, to any set of grid points, we can associate a Young diagram, so that the monomial ideal is constructed by determining the inner corners that make up the staircase diagram; likewise, given a monomial ideal, we can make up the Young diagram by looking at the $(a_i, b_j)$ and representing them as the inner corners of the Young diagram. The coordinates of the inner corners would represent the powers of the minimal monomials in $I$. Thus, monomial ideals can be described by Young diagrams of partitions.

Moreover, the $(\mathbb{C}^*)^2$-action on the set of $I \subset \mathbb{C}[x, y]$ such that $\dim_{\mathbb{C}} \mathbb{C}[x, y]/I = n$ as a vector space over $\mathbb{C}$ has fixed points corresponding to monomial ideals only, which correspond to integer partitions of size n, which are identified by Young diagrams with n boxes.

== Monomial orderings and Gröbner bases ==
A monomial ordering is a well ordering $\geq$ on the set of monomials such that if $a, m_1, m_2$ are monomials, then $am_1 \geq am_2$.

By the monomial order, we can state the following definitions for a polynomial in $\mathbb{K}[x_1, x_2, \dotsc, x_n]$.

Definition

1. Consider an ideal $I \subset \mathbb{K}[x_1, x_2, \dotsc, x_n]$, and a fixed monomial ordering. The leading term of a nonzero polynomial $f \in \mathbb{K}[x_1, x_2, \dotsc, x_n]$, denoted by $LT(f)$ is the monomial term of maximal order in $f$ and the leading term of $f = 0$ is $0$.
2. The ideal of leading terms, denoted by $LT(I)$, is the ideal generated by the leading terms of every element in the ideal, that is, $LT(I) = (LT(f) \mid f\in I)$.
3. A Gröbner basis for an ideal $I \subset \mathbb{K}[x_1, x_2, \dotsc, x_n]$ is a finite set of generators ${\{g_1, g_2, \dotsc, g_s}\}$ for $I$ whose leading terms generate the ideal of all the leading terms in $I$, i.e., $I = (g_1, g_2, \dotsc, g_s)$ and $LT(I) = (LT(g_1), LT(g_2), \dotsc, LT(g_s))$.

Note that $LT(I)$ in general depends on the ordering used; for example, if we choose the lexicographical order on $\mathbb{R}[x, y]$ subject to x > y, then $LT(2x^3y + 9xy^5 + 19) = 2x^3y$, but if we take y > x then $LT(2x^3y + 9xy^5 + 19) = 9xy^5$.

In addition, monomials are present on Gröbner basis and to define the division algorithm for polynomials in several indeterminates.

Notice that for a monomial ideal $I = (g_1, g_2, \dotsc, g_s) \in \mathbb{F}[x_1, x_2, \dotsc, x_n]$, the finite set of generators ${\{g_1, g_2, \dotsc, g_s}\}$ is a Gröbner basis for $I$. To see this, note that any polynomial $f \in I$ can be expressed as $f = a_1g_1 + a_2g_2 + \dotsm + a_sg_s$ for $a_i \in \mathbb{F}[x_1, x_2, \dotsc, x_n]$. Then the leading term of $f$ is a multiple for some $g_i$. As a result, $LT(I)$ is generated by the $g_i$ likewise.

Alternatively, this follows immediately from Buchberger's Criterion, since the S-polynomial of any two monomials is $0$ by definition.

== See also ==
- Hodge algebra
- Stanley–Reisner ring
- Toric ideal
