= Torus action =

In algebraic geometry, a torus action on an algebraic variety is a group action of an algebraic torus on the variety. A variety equipped with an action of a torus T is called a T-variety. In differential geometry, one considers an action of a real or complex torus on a manifold (or an orbifold).

A normal algebraic variety with a torus acting on it in such a way that there is a dense orbit is called a toric variety (for example, orbit closures that are normal are toric varieties).

== Linear action of a torus ==
A linear action of a torus can be simultaneously diagonalized, after extending the base field if necessary: if a torus T is acting on a finite-dimensional vector space V, then there is a direct sum decomposition:

$$V = \bigoplus_{\chi} V_{\chi}$$

where

- $\chi: T \to \mathbb{G}_m$ is a group homomorphism, a character of T.
- $V_{\chi} = \{ v \in V | t \cdot v = \chi(t) v \}$, T-invariant subspace called the weight subspace of weight $\chi$.

The decomposition exists because the linear action determines (and is determined by) a linear representation $\pi: T \to \operatorname{GL}(V)$ and then $\pi(T)$ consists of commuting diagonalizable linear transformations, upon extending the base field.

If V does not have finite dimension, the existence of such a decomposition is tricky but one easy case when decomposition is possible is when V is a union of finite-dimensional representations ($\pi$ is called rational; see below for an example). Alternatively, one uses functional analysis; for example, uses a Hilbert-space direct sum.

Example: Let $S = k[x_0, \dots, x_n]$ be a polynomial ring over an infinite field k. Let $T = \mathbb{G}_m^r$ act on it as algebra automorphisms by: for $t = (t_1, \dots, t_r) \in T$

$$t \cdot x_i = \chi_i(t) x_i$$

where

$\chi_i(t) = t_1^{\alpha_{i, 1}} \dots t_r^{\alpha_{i, r}},$ $\alpha_{i, j}$ = integers.

Then each $x_i$ is a T-weight vector and so a monomial $x_0^{m_0} \dots x_r^{m_r}$ is a T-weight vector of weight $\sum m_i \chi_i$. Hence,

$$S = \bigoplus_{m_0, \dots m_n \ge 0} S_{m_0 \chi_0 + \dots + m_n \chi_n}.$$

Note if $\chi_i(t) = t$ for all i, then this is the usual decomposition of the polynomial ring into homogeneous components.

== Białynicki-Birula decomposition ==
The Białynicki-Birula decomposition says that a smooth projective algebraic T-variety admits a T-stable cellular decomposition.

It is often described as algebraic Morse theory.

== See also ==
- Sumihiro's theorem
- GKM variety
- Equivariant cohomology
- monomial ideal
