= Wilfred Kaplan =

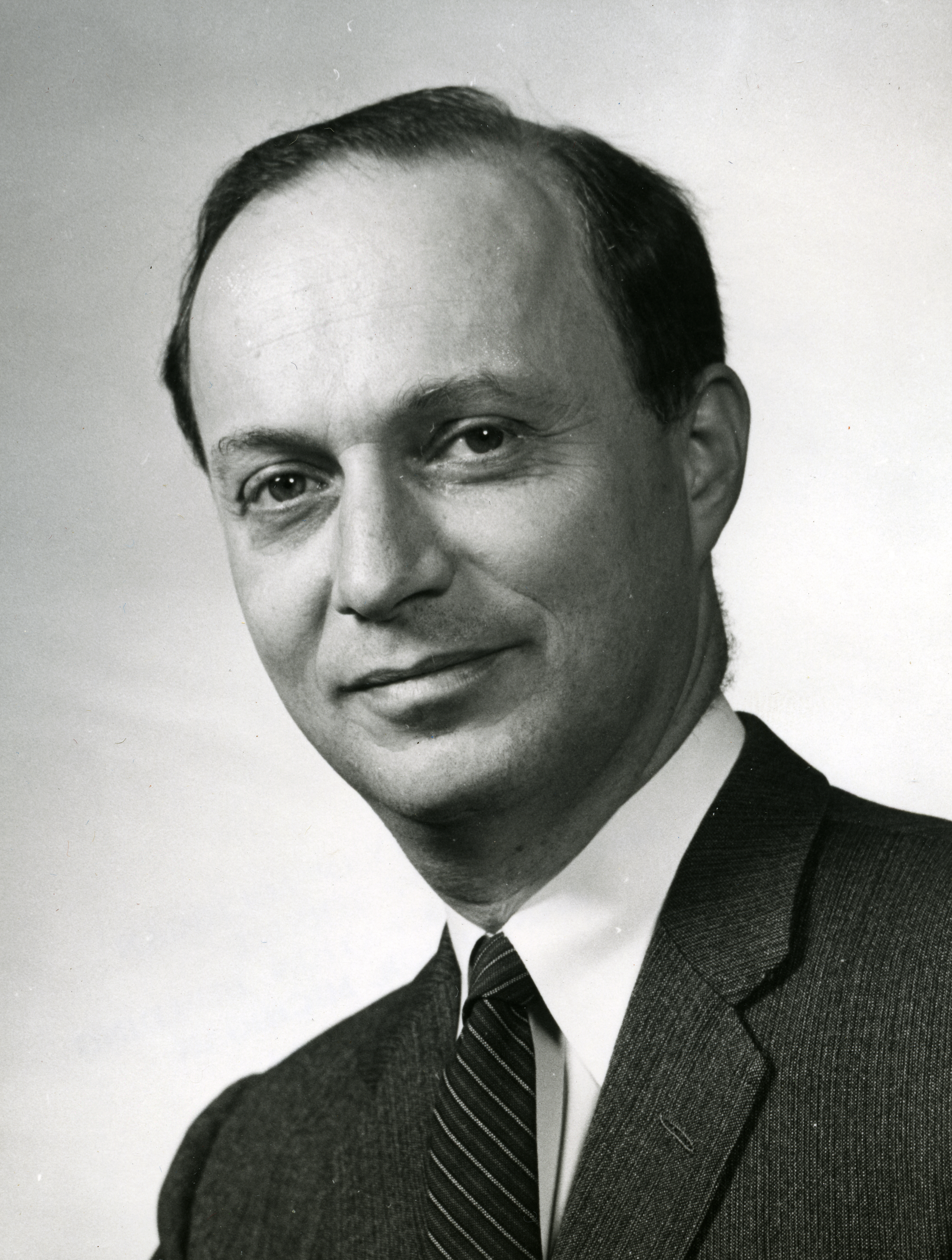
- Wilfred Kaplan, circa 1960
- Born: November 28, 1915; Boston, Massachusetts, US
- Died: December 26, 2007 (aged 92); Ann Arbor, Michigan, US
- Spouse: Ida Roetting (married 1938)
- Children: Roland Kaplan; Muriel Kaplan
- Parents: Jacob Kaplan; Anne Kaplan

Academic background
- Education: Harvard University
- Thesis: Regular Curve-Families Filling the Plane (1939)
- Doctoral advisor: Hassler Whitney

Academic work
- Discipline: Mathematics
- Doctoral students: William M. Boothby; Helen F. Cullen; George R. Sell

Wilfred Kaplan (November 28, 1915 – December 26, 2007) was a professor of mathematics at the University of Michigan for 46 years, from 1940 through 1986. His research focused on dynamical systems, the topology of curve families, complex function theory, and differential equations. In total, he authored over 30 research papers and 11 textbooks.

For over thirty years Kaplan was an active member of the American Association of University Professors (AAUP) and served as president of the University of Michigan chapter from 1978 to 1985.

== Early life ==
=== Education ===
Wilfred Kaplan was born in Boston, Massachusetts to Jacob and Anne Kaplan. He attended Boston Latin School and furthered his education at Harvard University, where he was granted his A.B. in mathematics in 1936 and graduated summa cum laude. Later that same year he received his master's degree at Harvard. Kaplan received a Rogers Fellow scholarship to study in Europe from 1936 to 1937, during his second year of graduate school. He was based out of Zürich, Switzerland where many of the mathematicians working on the applications of topology to differential equations were located. He also spent a month in Rome to work with famous mathematician Tullio Levi-Civita. Upon returning to the United States, Kaplan accepted a yearlong teaching fellowship at Rice Institute for the 1938–1939 school year, thus completing his graduate program. He received his Ph.D. from Harvard in 1939 under the advisement of Hassler Whitney. His dissertation covered regular curve families filling the plane.

=== Personal life ===
While attending lectures at the Eidgenössische Technische Hochschule (ETH) Zürich he met a fellow mathematician, Ida Roetting, whom he nicknamed Heidi and would eventually marry in 1938. The couple lived in Houston for a year after their wedding while Kaplan taught at the Rice Institute. The Kaplans had two children, Roland and Muriel. Wilfred Kaplan died at the age of 92 after a short illness.

== Work ==
=== Teaching and research ===
After Kaplan's short teaching position at Rice Institute, he went on to teach at the College of William and Mary in Virginia for one year. In 1940 he was invited by T. H. Hildebrandt to join the faculty at the University of Michigan, after he had previously attended the Topology Congress. The mathematics department at this time was diminishing due to the effects of World War II. Enrollment was down and some of the faculty had been granted leaves to do military research. When asked to record his contribution to the war effort, Kaplan mentioned teaching math exclusively to Air Force pre-meteorology students in the spring and summer of 1943, as well as teaching Navy V-12 and Army ASTP students for the majority of the academic year 1943–44. In June 1944, Kaplan worked at Brown University as a researcher in an Applied Mathematics Group for the Taylor Model Basin, the Watertown Arsenal and the Bureau of Ordnance of the Navy Department. He continued his research at Brown for 17 months. In May 1947 he outlined a curriculum for a new Lectures on Mathematics Project sponsored by the Office of Naval Research.

His early research focused primarily on dynamical systems, and the topology of curve families. In 1955, he became especially interested in complex function theory and made a significant contribution to mathematics in his study of a special class of Schlicht functions, for which he showed that the Bieberbach Conjecture held. His later research took on a more applied approach as he returned once more to differential equations, this time engaging in a more global analysis. In total, Wilfred Kaplan authored about 30 research papers.

Kaplan was named assistant professor in 1944, associate professor in 1950 and full professor in 1956. His lectures were characterized by clarity and directness, a skill which allowed him to write several popular mathematics textbooks. An updated version of his Advanced Calculus textbook is still used widely today. A selection of Kaplan's books can be found in the bibliography.

Kaplan taught a variety of undergraduate and graduate courses during his time at Michigan, and further advised eight doctoral students. Kaplan's skillful teaching won him respect among students and coworkers. Donald Lewis, chair of the mathematics department and co-author said, "First and foremost, Wilfred Kaplan was a teacher. He enjoyed conveying the beauty and usefulness of mathematics, and his students responded enthusiastically. He was a superb expositor, and his ability to elegantly convey mathematical ideas explains the enormous impact of his textbooks. When we were writing our joint texts, he never came to a meeting without a new idea to be incorporated."

One of Kaplan's primary goals as an educator was bridging the gap between pure and applied mathematics. He sympathized with the plight of engineers who felt the pressure to master more and more math concepts and then master the additional skill of applying it to their field. Kaplan wrote math textbooks specifically for engineers, such as Advanced Mathematics for Engineers (1981), because he believed teachers needed to work on presenting mathematical knowledge more efficiently to this group. Furthermore, he argued that science students in general, but specifically engineers, needed to be given other resources such as textbooks and articles to further their study outside of lectures along with the tools to employ those resources appropriately. He urged other textbook authors to use clear and simple language whenever possible, in order to “make the more advanced material accessible to those with limited background.”

He also taught a class called "Mathematical Ideas in Science and the Humanities," which focused on the use of math as an instrument to organize thinking about complex problems. More than just learning specific math content, Kaplan believed math was a medium through which to teach conciseness and how to recognize analogies, determine logical consequences of assumptions, and learn what questions need to be asked to tackle a given problem in any field.

=== AAUP ===
Wilfred Kaplan became a member of the national American Association of University Professors (AAUP) in 1946. He served as the vice president of the Michigan Conference AAUP from 1966 to 1968 and as president from 1969 to 1970. From 1973 to 1978, Kaplan served on the executive committee of the University of Michigan Chapter of the AAUP and took over as president in the years from 1978 through 1985. He continued being an active member even in his retirement, serving as executive secretary from 1985 to 2002. Kaplan received grievances from faculty members and supported collective bargaining (although the university faculty was never unionized). One of his primary concerns was retired professors on fixed incomes who were suffering under rising inflation. He sought to obtain a grant to provide the required financial aid. He also argued that retirees should receive more information about the health care options available to them, and he secured increases in maximum coverage and the annual reinstatement amounts allowed to retirees under the university health plan.

In the 1980s, Kaplan wrote an extensive proposal for a study of higher education in the United States. He argued that there should be more research of the inevitable challenges that would arise and that the University of Michigan would be a great case study whose results would be relevant for many public universities. In the proposal he outlined a variety of topics to be explored in the study: the historical background of higher education including tuition rates, enrollment rates, and changes in social customs; a study of changing demographics; the economic need for college-trained people for the betterment of society; and a thorough account of the present resources available to higher education and how these could be modified for greater efficiency.

In the 1990s, Kaplan's correspondence and reports focused heavily on the "grave difficulties" between faculty government leaders (members of the Senate Assembly) and the top administration offices, specifically President Duderstadt and Provost Whitaker. Many faculty grievances were concerned with the many decisions being made without faculty input and included complaints that President Duderstadt had only “modest interest in the views of others within the faculty.”

=== Additional clubs/Memberships ===
Kaplan was involved in a wide variety of other clubs as well. His interest in art lead him to become the president of the Washtenaw County Council for Arts. Kaplan also made a significant financial contribution to the ONCE Group, a group of artists, musicians, and film-makers known for their annual ONCE music festival in Ann Arbor; the group also spearheaded a film festival and a theatre ensemble in the 1960s. He was also a member of the American Mathematical Society (AMS), the American Physical Society (APS), and the Mathematical Association of America (MAA). He was on the State's Higher Education Capital Investment Advisory Committee although little is known about his specific role there. He was also Vice Chair of the university's Senate Advisory Committee on Academic Affairs, a subcommittee of the Senate Assembly. Additionally, Kaplan served as the treasurer of the Ann Arbor Unitarian Fellowship from 1972 to 2002. In his later years he was president of the University of Michigan Retirees Association.

== Awards ==
Kaplan was named collegiate professor by the Board of Regents of the university from 1973 to 1975 for his accomplishments as a teacher. In 1984, he received the Good Teaching Award, from what was then called the AMOCO foundation, now BP Amoco. The award recognized excellence in undergraduate instruction and sought to incentive great teaching. While serving on the Senate Advisory Committee on University Affairs, Kaplan received their Distinguished Faculty Governance Award in 1986.

== Retirement ==
Wilfred Kaplan retired in May 1986 after 46 years of service to the university. It was then that he received the emeritus distinction. Despite his retirement, Kaplan was still involved with the university. In the years to come he would receive several requests from the University Regents Commission to return to active duty to teach specific classes in the mathematics department. In 1990 he helped establish the Academic Freedom Lecture Fund (AFLF), allowing professors that were suspended or fired during the McCarthy era to hold lectures on campus. The film Keeping in Mind, an account of the mistreatment of the three professors who were suspended for their unpopular views during the McCarthy era, was played in the spring of 1989. After an audience member suggested the university make amends for its mistreatment of the three professors, the AAUP pursued this goal. First, university officials were contacted and a proposal was sent to the Senate Advisory Committee on University Affairs in October 1989. The Senate Assembly established the Academic Lecture Freedom Fund which was funded, in part, by the national AAUP. Kaplan was on the AFLF's board of directors until his death.

After his wife's death in 2005, Kaplan wrote a book titled Bill and Heidi: Beginning of our Lives Together, which was a translated composition of all their early correspondence before their wedding. Kaplan died on December 26, 2007, after a short illness. After his death, Walter Dublin, professor emeritus of Mechanical Engineering, wrote about Kaplan in a letter to the editor of the Ann Arbor News that Kaplan "worked tirelessly to improve the faculty--and, de facto, the university--by his work on many committees, work that spanned multiple decades. While he was a leader, he was never domineering, but always logical. Often, he would quietly remind his associates when they had strayed from their stated purpose or point out a legal or historical obstacle to what was being considered. He was always up to date and on the mark until he died, many years after he had retired."

== Selected bibliography ==
- Kaplan, Wilfred. Advanced Calculus. Reading, Mass.: Addison-Wesley, 1952. Print.
- Kaplan, Wilfred. Ordinary Differential Equations. Reading, Mass.: Addison-Wesley Pub., 1958. Print.
- Kaplan, Wilfred, and Donald J. Lewis. Calculus and Linear Algebra. New York: Wiley, 1970. Print.
- Kaplan, Wilfred. Advanced Mathematics for Engineers. Reading, Mass.: Addison-Wesley Pub., 1981. Print.
- Kaplan, Wilfred. Operational Methods for Linear Systems. Reading, Mass.: Addison-Wesley Pub., 1962. Print.
- Kaplan, Wilfred. "Regular curve-families filling the plane, I." Duke Mathematical Journal 7.1 (1940): 154–185. Web.
- Kaplan, Wilfred. "Regular Curve-families Filling the Plane, II." Duke Mathematical Journal 8.1 (1941): 11–46. Web.
- Kaplan, Wilfred. "Topology of Level Curves of Harmonic Functions." Transactions of the American Mathematical Society 63.3 (1948): 514. Web.
- Kaplan, Wilfred. "Dynamics of Linear Systems (Vaclav Dolez Al)." SIAM Review 8.2 (1966): 246–2. ProQuest. Web. 21 Mar. 2015.
- Kaplan, Wilfred. "Applications of Undergraduate Mathematics in Engineering (Ben Noble)." SIAM Review 10.3 (1968): 383–2. ProQuest. Web. 21 Mar. 2015.
- Kaplan, Wilfred. "Topics in Mathematical System Theory (Rudolf E. Kalman, Peter L. Falb and Michael A. Arbib)." SIAM Review 12.1 (1970): 157–2. ProQuest. Web. 21 Mar. 2015.
- Kaplan, Wilfred. "Topics in Ordinary Differential Equations: A Potpourri (William D. Lakin and David A. Sanchez)." SIAM Review 14.3 (1972): 508–2. ProQuest. Web. 21 Mar. 2015.
- Kaplan, Wilfred. "Ordinary Differential Equations in the Complex Domain (Einar Hills)." SIAM Review 19.4 (1977): 749–1. ProQuest. Web. 21 Mar. 2015.
- Kaplan, Wilfred. "Green's Functions and Boundary Value Problems (Ivar Stackgold)." SIAM Review 23.1 (1981): 117–2. ProQuest. Web. 21 Mar. 2015.
