= Fundamental vector field =

Instrument in differential geometry

In the study of mathematics, and especially of differential geometry, fundamental vector fields are instruments that describe the infinitesimal behaviour of a smooth Lie group action on a smooth manifold. Such vector fields find important applications in the study of Lie theory, symplectic geometry, and the study of Hamiltonian group actions.

== Motivation ==
Important to applications in mathematics and physics is the notion of a flow on a manifold. In particular, if $M$ is a smooth manifold and $X$ is a smooth vector field, one is interested in finding integral curves to $X$. More precisely, given $p \in M$ one is interested in curves $\gamma_p: \mathbb R \to M$ such that:

$$\gamma_p'(t) = X_{\gamma_p(t)}, \qquad \gamma_p(0) = p,$$

for which local solutions are guaranteed by the Existence and Uniqueness Theorem of Ordinary Differential Equations. If $X$ is furthermore a complete vector field, then the flow of $X$, defined as the collection of all integral curves for $X$, is a diffeomorphism of $M$. The flow $\phi_X: \mathbb R \times M \to M$ given by $\phi_X(t,p) = \gamma_p(t)$ is in fact an action of the additive Lie group $(\mathbb R,+)$ on $M$.

Conversely, every smooth action $A:\mathbb R \times M \to M$ defines a complete vector field $X$ via the equation:

$$X_p = \left.\frac{d}{dt}\right|_{t=0} A(t,p).$$

It is then a simple result that there is a bijective correspondence between $\mathbb R$-actions on $M$ and complete vector fields on $M$.

In the language of flow theory, the vector field $X$ is called the infinitesimal generator. Intuitively, the behaviour of the flow at each point corresponds to the "direction" indicated by the vector field. It is a natural question to ask whether one may establish a similar correspondence between vector fields and more arbitrary Lie group actions on $M$.

== Definition ==
Let $G$ be a Lie group with corresponding Lie algebra $\mathfrak g$. Furthermore, let $M$ be a smooth manifold endowed with a smooth action $A : G \times M \to M$. Denote the map $A_p: G \to M$ such that $A_p(g) = A(g,p)$, called the orbit map of $A$ corresponding to $p$. For $X \in \mathfrak g$, the fundamental vector field $X^\#$ corresponding to $X$ is given by any of the following equivalent definitions:

- $X^\#_p = d_e A_p(X)$
- $X^\#_p = d_{(e,p)}A\left(X,0_{T_p M}\right)$
- $X^\#_p = \left. \frac{d}{dt} \right|_{t=0} A\left( \exp(tX), p \right)$

where $d$ is the differential of a smooth map and $0_{T_pM}$ is the zero vector in the vector space $T_p M$.

The map $\mathfrak g \to \Gamma(TM), X \mapsto -X^\#$ can then be shown to be a Lie algebra homomorphism.

== Applications ==
=== Lie groups ===
The Lie algebra of a Lie group $G$ may be identified with either the left- or right-invariant vector fields on $G$. It is a well-known result that such vector fields are isomorphic to $T_e G$, the tangent space at identity. In fact, if we let $G$ act on itself via right-multiplication, the corresponding fundamental vector fields are precisely the left-invariant vector fields.

=== Hamiltonian group actions ===
In the motivation, it was shown that there is a bijective correspondence between smooth $\mathbb R$-actions and complete vector fields. Similarly, given a symplectic manifold $(M,\omega)$, there is a bijective correspondence between symplectic actions (the induced diffeomorphisms are all symplectomorphisms) and complete symplectic vector fields.

A closely related idea is that of Hamiltonian vector fields. Given a symplectic manifold $(M,\omega)$, we say that $X_H$ is a Hamiltonian vector field if there exists a smooth function $H: M \to \mathbb R$ satisfying

$$dH = \iota_{X_H}\omega$$

where the map $\iota$ is the interior product. This motivates the definition of a Hamiltonian group action as follows: If $G$ is a Lie group with Lie algebra $\mathfrak g$ and $A: G\times M \to M$ is a group action of $G$ on a smooth manifold $M$, then we say that $A$ is a Hamiltonian group action if there exists a moment map $\mu: M \to \mathfrak g^*$ such that for each: $X \in \mathfrak g$,

$$d\mu^X = \iota_{X^\#}\omega,$$

where $\mu^X:M \to \mathbb R, p \mapsto \langle \mu(p),X \rangle$ and $X^\#$ is the fundamental vector field of $X$.
