= Abelian Lie group =

In geometry, an abelian Lie group is a Lie group that is an abelian group.

A connected abelian real Lie group is isomorphic to $\mathbb{R}^k \times (S^1)^h$. In particular, a connected abelian (real) compact Lie group is a torus; i.e., a Lie group isomorphic to $(S^1)^h$. A connected complex Lie group that is a compact group is abelian and a connected compact complex Lie group is a complex torus; i.e., a quotient of $\mathbb{\Complex}^n$ by a lattice.

Let A be a compact abelian Lie group with the identity component $A_0$. If $A/A_0$ is a cyclic group, then $A$ is topologically cyclic; i.e., has an element that generates a dense subgroup. (In particular, a torus is topologically cyclic.)

== See also ==
- Cartan subgroup

== Works cited ==
- Knapp, Anthony W. (2001). Representation theory of semisimple groups. An overview based on examples. Princeton Landmarks in Mathematics. Princeton University Press. ISBN 0-691-09089-0.
- Procesi, Claudio (2007). Lie Groups: an approach through invariants and representation. Springer. ISBN 978-0387260402.
