= Equivariant cohomology =

Algebraic topology theory

In mathematics, equivariant cohomology (or Borel cohomology) is a cohomology theory from algebraic topology which applies to topological spaces with a group action. It can be viewed as a common generalization of group cohomology and an ordinary cohomology theory.

If $G$ acts freely, then the equivariant cohomology ring is just the singular cohomology ring of the quotient space $X / G$. In particular, if $G$ is the trivial group, then the equivariant cohomology ring is the ordinary cohomology ring of $X$. If $X$ is contractible, it reduces to the cohomology ring of the classifying space $BG$ (that is, the group cohomology of $G$ when $G$ is finite.)

== Definitions ==
Let $X$ be a topological space, with a (left) action by a group $G$. Let $EG$ be a contractible space with a free (right) action by the same group. Define $EG \times_G X$ to be the quotient space $(EG \times X) / {\sim}$, where the equivalence relation $\sim$ identifies $(e \cdot g, x)$ with $(e, g \cdot x)$ for all $e \in EG, x \in X, g \in G$. The equivariant cohomology ring of $X$ (with respect to the group $G$) is then defined as the singular cohomology ring of this space:
$$H^*_G(X) := H^*(EG \times_G X).$$
The space $EG \times_G X$ is known as the Borel construction, or homotopy quotient. Projection onto the first factor gives it the structure of a fibre bundle over the classifying space $BG$. This is the associated $X$-bundle obtained from the action of $G$ on $X$ and the principal bundle $EG \to BG$. The bundle $X \to EG \times_G X \to BG$ is called the Borel fibration.

The group cohomology ring of $G$ can be recovered by taking $X$ to be a point, as in this case the homotopy quotient is just the classifying space of $G$. If $G$ acts freely on $X$, then the canonical map $EG \times_G X \to X/G$ is a homotopy equivalence and so one gets $H_G^*(X) = H^*(X/G).$

It is also possible to define the equivariant cohomology $H_G^*(X;A)$ of $X$ with coefficients in a $G$-module A; these are abelian groups. This construction is the analogue of cohomology with local coefficients.

If X is a manifold, G a compact Lie group and coefficients are taken in the field of real numbers or the field of complex numbers (the most typical situation), then the above cohomology may be computed using the so-called Cartan model (see equivariant differential forms.)

The construction should not be confused with other cohomology theories, such as Bredon cohomology or the cohomology of invariant differential forms: if G is a compact Lie group, then, by the averaging argument, any form may be made invariant; thus, cohomology of invariant differential forms does not yield new information.

Koszul duality is known to hold between equivariant cohomology and ordinary cohomology.

=== Relation with groupoid cohomology ===
For a Lie groupoid $\mathfrak{X} = [X_1 \rightrightarrows X_0]$ equivariant cohomology of a smooth manifold is a special example of the groupoid cohomology of a Lie groupoid. This is because given a $G$-space $X$ for a compact Lie group $G$, there is an associated groupoid:

$\mathfrak{X}_G = [G\times X \rightrightarrows X]$

whose equivariant cohomology groups can be computed using the Cartan complex $\Omega_G^\bullet(X)$ which is the totalization of the de-Rham double complex of the groupoid. The terms in the Cartan complex are

$\Omega^n_G(X) = \bigoplus_{2k+i = n}(\text{Sym}^k(\mathfrak{g}^\vee)\otimes \Omega^i(X))^G$

where $\text{Sym}^\bullet(\mathfrak{g}^\vee)$ is the symmetric algebra of the dual Lie algebra from the Lie group $G$, and $(-)^G$ corresponds to the $G$-invariant forms. This is a particularly useful tool for computing the cohomology of $BG$ for a compact Lie group $G$ since this can be computed as the cohomology of

$[G \rightrightarrows *]$

where the action is trivial on a point. Then,

$H^*_{dR}(BG) = \bigoplus_{k\geq 0 }\text{Sym}^{2k}(\mathfrak{g}^\vee)^G$

For example,

$$\begin{align}
H^*_{dR}(BU(1)) &= \bigoplus_{k=0}\text{Sym}^{2k}(\mathbb{R}^\vee) \\
&\cong \mathbb{R}[t] \\
&\text{ where } \deg(t) = 2
\end{align}$$

since the $U(1)$-action on the dual Lie algebra is trivial.

== An example of a homotopy quotient ==
The following example is Proposition 1 of .

Let X be a complex projective algebraic curve. We identify X as a topological space with the set of the complex points $X(\mathbb{C})$, which is a compact Riemann surface. Let G be a complex simply connected semisimple Lie group. Then any principal G-bundle on X is isomorphic to a trivial bundle, since the classifying space $BG$ is 2-connected and X has real dimension 2. Fix some smooth G-bundle $P_\text{sm}$ on X. Then any principal G-bundle on $X$ is isomorphic to $P_\text{sm}$. In other words, the set $\Omega$ of all isomorphism classes of pairs consisting of a principal G-bundle on X and a complex-analytic structure on it can be identified with the set of complex-analytic structures on $P_\text{sm}$ or equivalently the set of holomorphic connections on X (since connections are integrable for dimension reason). $\Omega$ is an infinite-dimensional complex affine space and is therefore contractible.

Let $\mathcal{G}$ be the group of all automorphisms of $P_\text{sm}$ (i.e., gauge group.) Then the homotopy quotient of $\Omega$ by $\mathcal{G}$ classifies complex-analytic (or equivalently algebraic) principal G-bundles on X; i.e., it is precisely the classifying space $B\mathcal{G}$ of the discrete group $\mathcal{G}$.

One can define the moduli stack of principal bundles $\operatorname{Bun}_G(X)$ as the quotient stack $[\Omega/\mathcal{G}]$ and then the homotopy quotient $B\mathcal{G}$ is, by definition, the homotopy type of $\operatorname{Bun}_G(X)$.

== Equivariant characteristic classes ==
Let E be an equivariant vector bundle on a G-manifold M. It gives rise to a vector bundle $\widetilde{E}$ on the homotopy quotient $EG \times_G M$ so that it pulls-back to the bundle $\widetilde{E}=EG \times E$ over $EG \times M$. An equivariant characteristic class of E is then an ordinary characteristic class of $\widetilde{E}$, which is an element of the completion of the cohomology ring $H^*(EG \times_G M) = H^*_G(M)$. (In order to apply Chern–Weil theory, one uses a finite-dimensional approximation of EG.)

Alternatively, one can first define an equivariant Chern class and then define other characteristic classes as invariant polynomials of Chern classes as in the ordinary case; for example, the equivariant Todd class of an equivariant line bundle is the Todd function evaluated at the equivariant first Chern class of the bundle. (An equivariant Todd class of a line bundle is a power series (not a polynomial as in the non-equivariant case) in the equivariant first Chern class; hence, it belongs to the completion of the equivariant cohomology ring.)

In the non-equivariant case, the first Chern class can be viewed as a bijection between the set of all isomorphism classes of complex line bundles on a manifold M and $H^2(M; \mathbb{Z}).$ In the equivariant case, this translates to: the equivariant first Chern gives a bijection between the set of all isomorphism classes of equivariant complex line bundles and $H^2_G(M; \mathbb{Z})$.

== Localization theorem ==
The localization theorem is one of the most powerful tools in equivariant cohomology.

== See also ==
- Equivariant differential form
- Kirwan map
- Localization formula for equivariant cohomology
- GKM variety
- Bredon cohomology
