= Lie group action =

Concept in differential geometry

In differential geometry, a Lie group action is a group action adapted to the smooth setting: $G$ is a Lie group, $M$ is a smooth manifold, and the action map is differentiable.

== Definition ==
Let $\sigma: G \times M \to M, (g, x) \mapsto g \cdot x$ be a (left) group action of a Lie group $G$ on a smooth manifold $M$; it is called a Lie group action (or smooth action) if the map $\sigma$ is differentiable. Equivalently, a Lie group action of $G$ on $M$ consists of a Lie group homomorphism $G \to \mathrm{Diff}(M)$. A smooth manifold endowed with a Lie group action is also called a $G$-manifold.

=== Properties ===
The fact that the action map $\sigma$ is smooth has a couple of immediate consequences:

- the stabilizers $G_x \subseteq G$ of the group action are closed, thus are Lie subgroups of $G$
- the orbits $G \cdot x \subseteq M$ of the group action are immersed submanifolds.

Forgetting the smooth structure, a Lie group action is a particular case of a continuous group action.

== Examples ==
For every Lie group $G$, the following are Lie group actions:

- the trivial action of $G$ on any manifold;
- the action of $G$ on itself by left multiplication, right multiplication or conjugation;
- the action of any Lie subgroup $H \subseteq G$ on $G$ by left multiplication, right multiplication or conjugation;
- the adjoint action of $G$ on its Lie algebra $\mathfrak{g}$.

Other examples of Lie group actions include:

- the action of $\mathbb{R}$ on $M$ given by the flow of any complete vector field;
- the actions of the general linear group $\operatorname{GL}(n,\mathbb{R})$ and of its Lie subgroups $G\subseteq\operatorname{GL}(n,\mathbb{R})$ on $\mathbb{R}^n$ by matrix multiplication;
- more generally, any Lie group representation on a vector space;
- any Hamiltonian group action on a symplectic manifold;
- the transitive action underlying any homogeneous space;
- more generally, the group action underlying any principal bundle.

== Infinitesimal Lie algebra action ==
Following the spirit of the Lie group-Lie algebra correspondence, Lie group actions can also be studied from the infinitesimal point of view. Indeed, any Lie group action $\sigma: G \times M \to M$ induces an infinitesimal Lie algebra action on $M$, i.e. a Lie algebra homomorphism $\mathfrak{g} \to \mathfrak{X}(M)$. Intuitively, this is obtained by differentiating at the identity the Lie group homomorphism $G \to \mathrm{Diff}(M)$, and interpreting the set of vector fields $\mathfrak{X}(M)$ as the Lie algebra of the (infinite-dimensional) Lie group $\mathrm{Diff}(M)$.

More precisely, fixing any $x \in M$, the orbit map $\sigma_x : G \to M, g \mapsto g \cdot x$ is differentiable and one can compute its differential at the identity $e \in G$. If $X \in \mathfrak{g}$, then its image under $\mathrm{d}_e\sigma_x\colon \mathfrak{g}\to T_xM$ is a tangent vector at $x$, and varying $x$ one obtains a vector field on $M$. The minus of this vector field, denoted by $X^\#$, is also called the fundamental vector field associated with $X$ (the minus sign ensures that $\mathfrak{g} \to \mathfrak{X}(M), X \mapsto X^\#$ is a Lie algebra homomorphism).

Conversely, by Lie–Palais theorem, any abstract infinitesimal action of a (finite-dimensional) Lie algebra on a compact manifold can be integrated to a Lie group action.

=== Properties ===
An infinitesimal Lie algebra action $\mathfrak{g} \to \mathfrak{X}(M)$ is injective if and only if the corresponding global Lie group action is free. This follows from the fact that the kernel of $\mathrm{d}_e\sigma_x\colon \mathfrak{g}\to T_xM$ is the Lie algebra $\mathfrak{g}_x \subseteq \mathfrak{g}$ of the stabilizer $G_x \subseteq G$.

On the other hand, $\mathfrak{g} \to \mathfrak{X}(M)$ in general not surjective. For instance, let $\pi: P \to M$ be a principal $G$-bundle: the image of the infinitesimal action is actually equal to the vertical subbundle $T^\pi P \subset TP$.

== Proper actions ==
An important (and common) class of Lie group actions is that of proper ones. Indeed, such a topological condition implies that

- the stabilizers $G_x \subseteq G$ are compact
- the orbits $G \cdot x \subseteq M$ are embedded submanifolds
- the orbit space $M/G$ is Hausdorff

In general, if a Lie group $G$ is compact, any smooth $G$-action is automatically proper. An example of proper action by a not necessarily compact Lie group is given by the action a Lie subgroup $H \subseteq G$ on $G$.

== Structure of the orbit space ==
Given a Lie group action of $G$ on $M$, the orbit space $M/G$ does not admit in general a manifold structure. However, if the action is free and proper, then $M/G$ has a unique smooth structure such that the projection $M \to M/G$ is a submersion (in fact, $M \to M/G$ is a principal $G$-bundle).

The fact that $M/G$ is Hausdorff depends only on the properness of the action (as discussed above); the rest of the claim requires freeness and is a consequence of the slice theorem. If the "free action" condition (i.e. "having zero stabilizers") is relaxed to "having finite stabilizers", $M/G$ becomes instead an orbifold (or quotient stack).

=== Equivariant cohomology ===
An application of this principle is the Borel construction from algebraic topology. Assuming that $G$ is compact, let $EG$ denote the universal bundle, which we can assume to be a manifold since $G$ is compact, and let $G$ act on $EG \times M$ diagonally. The action is free since it is so on the first factor and is proper since $G$ is compact; thus, one can form the quotient manifold $M_G = (EG \times M)/G$ and define the equivariant cohomology of M as

$$H^*_G(M) = H^*_{\text{dr}}(M_G)$$,

where the right-hand side denotes the de Rham cohomology of the manifold $M_G$.

== See also ==
- Hamiltonian group action
- Equivariant differential form
- Isotropy representation
