= Chow's theorem =

In mathematics, Chow's theorem may refer to a number of theorems due to Wei-Liang Chow:

- Chow's theorem: Any analytic subvariety in projective space is actually algebraic.
- Chow–Rashevskii theorem: In sub-Riemannian geometry, any two points are connected by a horizontal curve.

== See also ==
- Chow's lemma
- Chow's moving lemma
