= Distribution (differential geometry) =

Subbundle of the tangent bundle

In differential geometry, a discipline within mathematics, a distribution on a manifold $M$ is an assignment $x \mapsto \Delta_x \subseteq T_x M$ of vector subspaces satisfying certain properties. In the most common situations, a distribution is asked to be a vector subbundle of the tangent bundle $TM$. If the length of the vector is not needed, i.e. if one is concerned only with the subspaces themselves, projectivized, then it can also be constructed as a subbundle of the contact bundle.

Distributions satisfying a further integrability condition give rise to foliations, i.e. partitions of the manifold into smaller submanifolds. These notions have several applications in many fields of mathematics, including integrable systems, Poisson geometry, non-commutative geometry, sub-Riemannian geometry, differential topology.

Even though they share the same name, distributions presented in this article have nothing to do with distributions in the sense of analysis.

== Definition ==
Let $M$ be a smooth manifold; a (smooth) distribution $\Delta$ assigns to any point $x \in M$ a vector subspace $\Delta_x \subset T_xM$ in a smooth way. More precisely, $\Delta$ consists of a collection $\{ \Delta_x \subset T_xM \}_{x \in M}$ of vector subspaces with the following property: Around any $x \in M$ there exist a neighbourhood $N_x \subset M$ and a collection of vector fields $X_1,\ldots,X_k$ such that, for any point $y \in N_x$, span$\{ X_1(y),\ldots,X_k(y) \} = \Delta_y.$

The set of smooth vector fields $\{ X_1,\ldots,X_k \}$ is also called a local basis of $\Delta$. These need not be linearly independent at every point, and so aren't formally a vector space basis at every point; thus, the term local generating set can be more appropriate. The notation $\Delta$ is used to denote both the assignment $x \mapsto \Delta_x$ and the subset $\Delta = \amalg_{x \in M} \Delta_x \subseteq TM$.

=== Regular distributions ===
Given an integer $n \leq m = \mathrm{dim}(M)$, a smooth distribution $\Delta$ on $M$ is called regular of rank $n$ if all the subspaces $\Delta_x \subset T_xM$ have the same dimension $n$. Locally, this amounts to ask that every local basis is given by $n$ linearly independent vector fields.

More compactly, a regular distribution is a vector subbundle $\Delta \subset TM$ of rank $n$ (this is actually the most commonly used definition). A rank $n$ distribution is sometimes called an $n$-plane distribution, and when $n = m-1$, one talks about hyperplane distributions.

== Special classes of distributions ==
Unless stated otherwise, by "distribution" we mean a smooth regular distribution (in the sense explained above).

=== Involutive distributions ===
Given a distribution $\Delta$, its sections consist of vector fields on $M,$ forming a vector subspace $\Gamma(\Delta) \subseteq \Gamma(TM) = \mathfrak{X}(M)$ of the space of all vector fields on $M$. (Notation: $\Gamma(TM)$ is the space of sections of $TM.$) A distribution $\Delta$ is called involutive if $\Gamma(\Delta) \subseteq \mathfrak{X}(M)$ is also a Lie subalgebra: in other words, for any two vector fields $X, Y \in \Gamma(\Delta) \subseteq \mathfrak{X}(M)$, the Lie bracket $[X,Y]$ belongs to $\Gamma(\Delta) \subseteq \mathfrak{X}(M)$.

Locally, this condition means that for every point $x \in M$ there exists a local basis $\{ X_1,\ldots,X_n \}$ of the distribution in a neighbourhood of $x$ such that, for all $1 \leq i, j \leq n$, the Lie bracket $[X_i,X_j]$ is in the span of $\{ X_1,\ldots,X_n \}$, i.e. $[X_i,X_j]$ is a linear combination of $\{ X_1,\ldots,X_n \}.$

Involutive distributions are a fundamental ingredient in the study of integrable systems. A related idea occurs in Hamiltonian mechanics: two functions $f$ and $g$ on a symplectic manifold are said to be in mutual involution if their Poisson bracket vanishes.

=== Integrable distributions and foliations ===
An integral manifold for a rank $n$ distribution $\Delta$ is a submanifold $N \subset M$ of dimension $n$ such that $T_xN = \Delta_x$ for every $x \in N$. A distribution is called integrable if through any point $x \in M$ there is an integral manifold. The base spaces of the bundle $\Delta \subset TM$ are thus disjoint, maximal, connected integral manifolds, also called leaves; that is, $\Delta$ defines an n-dimensional foliation of $M$.

Locally, integrability means that for every point $x \in M$ there exists a local chart $(U, \{ \chi_1,\ldots,\chi_n \})$ such that, for every $y \in U$, the space $\Delta_y$ is spanned by the coordinate vectors $\frac{\partial}{\partial \chi_1}(y), \ldots, \frac{\partial}{\partial \chi_n}(y)$. In other words, every point admits a foliation chart, i.e. the distribution $\Delta$ is tangent to the leaves of a foliation. Moreover, this local characterisation coincides with the definition of integrability for a $G$-structures, when $G$ is the group of real invertible upper-triangular block matrices (with $(n \times n)$ and $(m-n,m-n)$-blocks).

It is easy to see that any integrable distribution is automatically involutive. The converse is less trivial but holds by Frobenius theorem.

=== Weakly regular distributions ===
Given any distribution $\Delta \subseteq TM$, the associated Lie flag is a grading, defined as

$$\Delta^{(0)} \subseteq \Delta^{(1)} \subseteq \ldots \subseteq \Delta^{(i)} \subseteq \Delta^{(i+1)} \subseteq \ldots$$

where $\Delta^{(0)} := \Gamma(\Delta)$, $\Delta^{(1)} := \langle [ \Delta^{(0)}, \Delta^{(0)} ] \rangle_{\mathcal{C}^\infty(M)}$ and $\Delta^{(i+1)} := \langle [ \Delta^{(i)}, \Delta^{(0)} ] \rangle_{\mathcal{C}^\infty(M)}$. In other words, $\Delta^{(i)} \subseteq \mathfrak{X}(M)$ denotes the set of vector fields spanned by the $i$-iterated Lie brackets of elements in $\Gamma(\Delta)$. Some authors use a negative decreasing grading for the definition.

Then $\Delta$ is called weakly regular (or just regular by some authors) if there exists a sequence $\{T^i M \subseteq TM \}_i$ of nested vector subbundles such that $\Gamma(T^iM) = \Delta^{(i)}$ (hence $T^0 M = \Delta$). Note that, in such case, the associated Lie flag stabilises at a certain point $m \in \mathbb{N}$, since the ranks of $T^iM$ are bounded from above by $\mathrm{rank}(TM) = \mathrm{dim}(M)$. The string of integers $(\mathrm{rank}(\Delta^{(0)}), \mathrm{rank}(\Delta^{(1)}), \ldots, \mathrm{rank}(\Delta^{(m)}))$ is then called the grow vector of $\Delta$.

Any weakly regular distribution has an associated graded vector bundle
$$\mathrm{gr}(TM):= T^0 M \oplus \Big( \bigoplus_{i=0}^{ m-1} T^{i+1}M/T^iM \Big) \oplus TM/T^m M.$$
Moreover, the Lie bracket of vector fields descends, for any $i,j = 0,\ldots,m$, to a $\mathcal{C}^{\infty}(M)$-linear bundle morphism $\mathrm{gr}_i(TM) \times \mathrm{gr}_j(TM) \to \mathrm{gr}_{i+j+1}(TM)$, called the $(i,j)$-curvature. In particular, the $(0,0)$-curvature vanishes identically if and only if the distribution is involutive.

Patching together the curvatures, one obtains a morphism $\mathcal{L}: \mathrm{gr}(TM) \times \mathrm{gr}(TM) \to \mathrm{gr}(TM)$, also called the Levi bracket, which makes $\mathrm{gr}(TM)$ into a bundle of nilpotent Lie algebras; for this reason, $(\mathrm{gr}(TM), \mathcal{L})$ is also called the nilpotentisation of $\Delta$.

The bundle $\mathrm{gr}(TM) \to M$, however, is in general not locally trivial, since the Lie algebras $\mathrm{gr}_i(T_xM) := T^i_x M/T^{i+1}_x M$ are not isomorphic when varying the point $x \in M$. If this happens, the weakly regular distribution $\Delta$ is also called regular (or strongly regular by some authors). Note that the names (strongly, weakly) regular used here are completely unrelated with the notion of regularity discussed above (which is always assumed), i.e. the dimension of the spaces $\Delta_x$ being constant.

=== Bracket-generating distributions ===
A distribution $\Delta \subseteq TM$ is called bracket-generating (or non-holonomic, or it is said to satisfy the Hörmander condition) if taking a finite number of Lie brackets of elements in $\Gamma(\Delta)$ is enough to generate the entire space of vector fields on $M$. With the notation introduced above, such condition can be written as $\Delta^{(m)} = \mathfrak{X}(M)$ for certain $m \in \mathbb{N}$; then one says also that $\Delta$ is bracket-generating in $m+1$ steps, or has depth $m+1$.

Clearly, the associated Lie flag of a bracket-generating distribution stabilises at the point $m$. Even though being weakly regular and being bracket-generating are two independent properties (see the examples below), when a distribution satisfies both of them, the integer $m$ from the two definitions is the same.

Thanks to the Chow-Rashevskii theorem, given a bracket-generating distribution $\Delta \subseteq TM$ on a connected manifold, any two points in $M$ can be joined by a path tangent to the distribution.

=== Stable distributions ===
A distribution $\Delta \subseteq TM$ is stable if under any $C^2$ small perturbation, there exists a diffeomorphism that maps distribution $\Delta'$ back to $\Delta$. There exists only 3 cases:

- Rank 1: a fibration, essentially a vector field without length.
- Corank 1: a hyperplane distribution. When the ambient dimension is odd, it is the contact form. When the ambient dimension is even, it is the even contact form.
- Rank 2, dimension 4: The special case of Engel distributions. All Engel distributions are locally of the form
  $$\alpha=d z-x d y, \quad \beta=d x-w d y$$

Equivalently, Engel distributions are characterized by
$$\begin{aligned}
\operatorname{rank}\mathcal{D} &= 2 \\
\operatorname{rank}[\mathcal{D}, \mathcal{D}] & =3 \\
\operatorname{rank}[\mathcal{D},[\mathcal{D}, \mathcal{D}]] & =4,
\end{aligned}$$

== Examples of regular distributions ==
=== Integrable distributions ===
- Any vector field $X$ on $M$ defines a rank 1 distribution, by setting $\Delta_x := \langle X_x \rangle \subseteq T_x M$, which is automatically integrable: the image of any integral curve $\gamma: I \to M$ is an integral manifold.
- The trivial distribution of rank $k$ on $M = \mathbb{R}^n$ is generated by the first $k$ coordinate vector fields $\frac{\partial}{\partial x_1}, \ldots, \frac{\partial}{\partial x_k}$. It is automatically integrable, and the integral manifolds are defined by the equations $\{ x_i = c_i \}_{i=k+1,\ldots,n}$, for any constants $c_i \in \mathbb{R}$.
- In general, any involutive/integrable distribution is weakly regular (with $\Delta^{(i)} = \Gamma(\Delta)$ for every $i$), but it is never bracket-generating.

=== Non-integrable distributions ===
- The Martinet distribution on $M = \mathbb{R}^3$ is given by $\Delta = \ker(\omega) \subseteq TM$ , for $\omega = dy-z^2dx \in \Omega^1 (M)$; equivalently, it is generated by the vector fields $\frac{\partial}{\partial x} + z^2 \frac{\partial}{\partial y}$ and $\frac{\partial}{\partial z}$. It is bracket-generating since $\Delta^{(2)} = \mathfrak{X}(M)$, but it is not weakly regular: $\Delta^{(1)}$ has rank 3 everywhere except on the surface $z=0$.
- The contact distribution on $M = \mathbb{R}^{2n+1}$ is given by $\Delta = \ker(\omega) \subseteq TM$ , for $\omega = dz + \sum_{i=1}^n x_i dy_i \in \Omega^1 (M)$; equivalently, it is generated by the vector fields $\frac{\partial}{\partial y_i}$ and $\frac{\partial}{\partial x_i} + y_i \frac{\partial}{\partial z}$, for $i=1,\ldots,n$. It is weakly regular, with grow vector $(2n, 2n+1)$, and bracket-generating, with $\Delta^{(1)} = \mathfrak{X}(M)$. One can also define an abstract contact structures on a manifold $M^{2n+1}$ as a hyperplane distribution which is maximally non-integrable, i.e. it is as far from being involutive as possible. An analogue of the Darboux theorem shows that such structure has the unique local model described above.
- The Engel distribution on $M = \mathbb{R}^4$ is given by $\Delta = \ker(\omega_1) \cap \ker(\omega_2) \subseteq TM$, for $\omega_1 = dz-wdx \in \Omega^1(M)$ and $\omega_2 = dy - zdx \in \Omega^1 (M)$; equivalently, it is generated by the vector fields $\frac{\partial}{\partial x} + z \frac{\partial}{\partial y} + w \frac{\partial}{\partial z}$ and $\frac{\partial}{\partial w}$. It is weakly regular, with grow vector $(2, 3, 4)$, and bracket-generating. One can also define an abstract Engel structure on a manifold $M^4$ as a weakly regular rank 2 distribution $\Delta \subseteq TM$ such that $\Delta^{(1)}$ has rank 3 and $\Delta^{(2)}$has rank 4; Engel proved that such structure has the unique local model described above.
- In general, a Goursat structure on a manifold $M^{k+2}$ is a rank 2 distribution which is weakly regular and bracket-generating, with grow vector $(2, 3, \ldots, k+1, k+2)$. For $k=1$ and $k=2$ one recovers, respectively, contact distributions on 3-dimensional manifolds and Engel distributions. Goursat structures are locally diffeomorphic to the Cartan distribution of the jet bundles $J^k (\mathbb{R}, \mathbb{R})$.

== Singular distributions ==
A singular distribution, generalised distribution, or Stefan-Sussmann distribution, is a smooth distribution which is not regular. This means that the subspaces $\Delta_x \subset T_xM$ may have different dimensions, and therefore the subset $\Delta \subset TM$ is no longer a smooth subbundle.

In particular, the number of elements in a local basis spanning $\Delta_x$ will change with $x$, and those vector fields will no longer be linearly independent everywhere. It is not hard to see that the dimension of $\Delta_x$ is lower semicontinuous, so that at special points the dimension is lower than at nearby points.

=== Integrability and singular foliations ===
The definitions of integral manifolds and of integrability given above applies also to the singular case (removing the requirement of the fixed dimension). However, Frobenius theorem does not hold in this context, and involutivity is in general not sufficient for integrability (counterexamples in low dimensions exist).

After several partial results, the integrability problem for singular distributions was fully solved by a theorem independently proved by Stefan and Sussmann. It states that a singular distribution $\Delta$ is integrable if and only if the following two properties hold:

- $\Delta$ is generated by a family $F \subseteq \mathfrak{X}(M)$ of vector fields;
- $\Delta$ is invariant with respect to every $X \in F$, i.e. $(\phi^t_X)_* (\Delta_y) \subseteq \Delta_{\phi^t_X(y)}$, where $\phi^t_X$ is the flow of $X$, $t \in \mathbb{R}$ and $y \in \mathrm{dom}(X)$.

Similarly to the regular case, an integrable singular distribution defines a singular foliation, which intuitively consists in a partition of $M$ into submanifolds (the maximal integral manifolds of $\Delta$) of different dimensions.

The definition of singular foliation can be made precise in several equivalent ways. Actually, in the literature there is a plethora of variations, reformulations and generalisations of the Stefan-Sussman theorem, using different notion of singular foliations according to which applications one has in mind, e.g. Poisson geometry or non-commutative geometry.

=== Examples ===
- Given a Lie group action of a Lie group on a manifold $M$, its infinitesimal generators span a singular distribution which is always integrable; the leaves of the associated singular foliation are precisely the orbits of the group action. The distribution/foliation is regular if and only if the action is free.
- Given a Poisson manifold $(M,\pi)$, the image of $\pi^\sharp = \iota_\pi: T^*M \to TM$ is a singular distribution which is always integrable; the leaves of the associated singular foliation are precisely the symplectic leaves of $(M,\pi)$. The distribution/foliation is regular If and only if the Poisson manifold is regular.
- More generally, the image of the anchor map $\rho: A \to TM$ of any Lie algebroid $A \to M$ defines a singular distribution which is automatically integrable, and the leaves of the associated singular foliation are precisely the leaves of the Lie algebroid. The distribution/foliation is regular if and only if $\rho$ has constant rank, i.e. the Lie algebroid is regular. Considering, respectively, the action Lie algebroid $M \times \mathfrak{g}$ and the cotangent Lie algebroid $T^* M$, one recovers the two examples above.
- In dynamical systems, a singular distribution arise from the set of vector fields that commute with a given one.
- There are also examples and applications in control theory, where the generalised distribution represents infinitesimal constraints of the system.

== Books, lecture notes and external links ==
- William M. Boothby. Section IV. 8 in An Introduction to Differentiable Manifolds and Riemannian Geometry, Academic Press, San Diego, California, 2003.
- John M. Lee, Chapter 19 in Introduction to Smooth Manifolds, Graduate Texts in Mathematics, Springer-Verlag, 2003.
- Richard Montgomery, Chapters 2, 4 and 6 in A tour of subriemannian geometries, their geodesics and applications. Mathematical Surveys and Monographs 91. Amer. Math. Soc., Providence, RI, 2002.
- Álvaro del Pino, Topological aspects in the study of tangent distributions. Textos de Matemática. Série B, 48. Universidade de Coimbra, 2019.
- "Involutive distribution", Encyclopedia of Mathematics, EMS Press, 2001 [1994]
