= Flag bundle =

Scheme parametrizing flags in the fibers of a vector bundle

== Definition ==
In algebraic geometry, let $X$ be a scheme, let $\mathcal E$ be a vector bundle of rank $n$ on $X$, and fix integers
$$0<d_1<d_2<\cdots<d_r<n.$$
The flag bundle, or relative flag variety, of type $(d_1,\ldots,d_r)$ associated with $\mathcal E$ is the $X$-scheme
$$p\colon \operatorname{Fl}_{d_1,\ldots,d_r}(\mathcal E)\longrightarrow X$$
whose fiber over a point $x\in X$ is the flag variety parametrizing chains
$$V_{d_1}\subset V_{d_2}\subset\cdots\subset V_{d_r}
\subset \mathcal E(x),
\qquad \dim_{\kappa(x)}V_{d_i}=d_i,$$
where $\mathcal E(x)=\mathcal E_x\otimes_{\mathcal O_{X,x}}\kappa(x)$ is the fiber of $\mathcal E$ at $x$.

== Universal property ==
The flag bundle represents the functor which assigns to an $X$-scheme $f\colon T\to X$ the set of flags of subbundles
$$0\subset \mathcal S_{d_1}\subset\mathcal S_{d_2}
\subset\cdots\subset\mathcal S_{d_r}\subset f^*\mathcal E,$$
where $\mathcal S_{d_i}$ has rank $d_i$. Here, a subbundle is understood to be locally a direct summand, equivalently, to have a locally free quotient.

Consequently, on $\operatorname{Fl}_{d_1,\ldots,d_r}(\mathcal E)$ there is a tautological flag
$$0\subset\mathcal U_{d_1}\subset\mathcal U_{d_2}
\subset\cdots\subset\mathcal U_{d_r}\subset p^*\mathcal E,$$
with $\operatorname{rank}\mathcal U_{d_i}=d_i$. Every family of flags over an $X$-scheme is obtained uniquely by pulling back this tautological flag.

Some authors define flag bundles using chains of locally free quotients rather than subbundles. The two conventions are equivalent after passing to dual bundles and reversing the sequence of ranks.

== Construction ==
Flag bundles can be constructed as iterated Grassmann bundles. Set $d_0=0$, $X_0=X$, and $\mathcal U_{d_0}=0$. Suppose that $X_{i-1}$ and the universal rank-$d_{i-1}$ subbundle $\mathcal U_{d_{i-1}}\subset\mathcal E_{X_{i-1}}$ have been constructed. Define
$$X_i=
\operatorname{Gr}_{d_i-d_{i-1}}
\left(\mathcal E_{X_{i-1}}/\mathcal U_{d_{i-1}}\right).$$
The universal subbundle of the quotient has an inverse image $\mathcal U_{d_i}\subset\mathcal E_{X_i}$. After $r$ steps one obtains
$$X_r\cong\operatorname{Fl}_{d_1,\ldots,d_r}(\mathcal E).$$

For the complete flag bundle, where $d_i=i$ for $1\leq i\leq n-1$, each step chooses a line in a quotient bundle. Thus, the complete flag bundle is a tower of projective bundles:
$$\operatorname{Fl}(\mathcal E)
\longrightarrow\operatorname{Fl}_{1,\ldots,n-2}(\mathcal E)
\longrightarrow\cdots
\longrightarrow\mathbf P(\mathcal E)
\longrightarrow X.$$

== Basic properties ==
Formation of the flag bundle commutes with arbitrary base change. If $g\colon Y\to X$, then there is a canonical isomorphism
$$\operatorname{Fl}_{d_1,\ldots,d_r}(g^*\mathcal E)
\cong
Y\times_X\operatorname{Fl}_{d_1,\ldots,d_r}(\mathcal E).$$

On an open subset $U\subset X$ over which $\mathcal E$ is trivial, the flag bundle is a product
$$\operatorname{Fl}_{d_1,\ldots,d_r}(\mathcal E)|_U
\cong
U\times\operatorname{Fl}_{d_1,\ldots,d_r}(\mathbb Z^n).$$
In particular, the morphism $p$ is smooth and projective. Its relative dimension is
$$\sum_{i=1}^{r}(d_i-d_{i-1})(n-d_i),
\qquad d_0=0.$$

Equivalently, if $\operatorname{Fr}(\mathcal E)$ is the principal $\operatorname{GL}_n$-bundle of frames of $\mathcal E$ and $P\subset\operatorname{GL}_n$ is the parabolic subgroup stabilizing a standard flag of type $(d_1,\ldots,d_r)$, then
$$\operatorname{Fl}_{d_1,\ldots,d_r}(\mathcal E)
\cong
\operatorname{Fr}(\mathcal E)
\times^{\operatorname{GL}_n}
\operatorname{GL}_n/P.$$

== Special cases ==
If $X=\operatorname{Spec}k$ is a point, the flag bundle is the usual flag variety of a vector space. If $r=1$, it is the Grassmann bundle $\operatorname{Gr}_{d_1}(\mathcal E)$. Under the convention that $\mathbf P(\mathcal E)$ parametrizes lines, the case $d_1=1$ is the projective bundle $\mathbf P(\mathcal E)$.

The type $(1,2,\ldots,n-1)$ gives the complete flag bundle $\operatorname{Fl}(\mathcal E)$; all other types are called partial flag bundles.

== Sections and fixed flags ==
By the universal property, a section
$$s\colon X\longrightarrow
\operatorname{Fl}_{d_1,\ldots,d_r}(\mathcal E)$$
is equivalent to a flag of subbundles
$$0\subset\mathcal E_{d_1}\subset\cdots
\subset\mathcal E_{d_r}\subset\mathcal E$$
of the prescribed ranks. Thus, a fixed flag of subbundles is not required to define the flag bundle; rather, it gives a section of it.

A fixed flag may also be used to impose incidence or rank conditions on the tautological flag. The resulting closed subschemes are relative Schubert varieties, and their pullbacks by sections give degeneracy loci.

== Splitting principle ==
On the complete flag bundle, put $\mathcal U_0=0$ and $\mathcal U_n=p^*\mathcal E$. The successive quotients
$$\mathcal L_i=\mathcal U_i/\mathcal U_{i-1},
\qquad 1\leq i\leq n,$$
are line bundles. Hence $p^*\mathcal E$ has a canonical filtration with line-bundle quotients, and its total Chern class satisfies
$$c(p^*\mathcal E)=\prod_{i=1}^{n}
\left(1+c_1(\mathcal L_i)\right).$$
This is one geometric form of the splitting principle and is a principal application of complete flag bundles in intersection theory.

== See also ==
- Flag variety
- Grassmann bundle
- Projective bundle
- Schubert variety
- Splitting principle
