= Prolongation (disambiguation) =

'Prolongation' may refer to:

- Prolongation (music)
- Cartan–Kuranishi prolongation theorem
- Natural prolongation principle
