= Sub-Riemannian manifold =

Type of generalization of a Riemannian manifold

In mathematics, a sub-Riemannian manifold is a certain type of generalization of a Riemannian manifold. Roughly speaking, to measure distances in a sub-Riemannian manifold, you are allowed to go only along curves tangent to so-called horizontal subspaces.

Sub-Riemannian manifolds (and so, a fortiori, Riemannian manifolds) carry a natural intrinsic metric called the metric of Carnot–Carathéodory. The Hausdorff dimension of such metric spaces is always an integer and larger than its topological dimension (unless it is actually a Riemannian manifold).

Sub-Riemannian manifolds often occur in the study of constrained systems in classical mechanics, such as the motion of vehicles on a surface, the motion of robot arms, and the orbital dynamics of satellites. Geometric quantities such as the Berry phase may be understood in the language of sub-Riemannian geometry. The Heisenberg group, important to quantum mechanics, carries a natural sub-Riemannian structure.

== Definitions ==
By a distribution on $M$ we mean a subbundle of the tangent bundle of $M$ (see also distribution).

Given a distribution $H(M)\subseteq T(M)$ a vector field in $H(M)$ is called horizontal. A curve $\gamma$ on $M$ is called horizontal if $\dot\gamma(t)\in H_{\gamma(t)}(M)$ for any $t$.

A distribution $H(M)$ is called completely non-integrable or bracket generating if for any $x\in M$ we have that any tangent vector can be presented as a linear combination of Lie brackets of horizontal fields, i.e. vectors of the form
$$A(x),\ [A,B](x),\ [A,[B,C]](x),\ [A,[B,[C,D]]](x),\dotsc\in T_x(M)$$
where all vector fields $A,B,C,D, \dots$ are horizontal. This requirement is also known as Hörmander's condition.

A sub-Riemannian manifold is a triple $(M, H, g)$, where $M$ is a differentiable manifold, $H$ is a completely non-integrable "horizontal" distribution and $g$ is a smooth section of positive-definite quadratic forms on $H$.

Any (connected) sub-Riemannian manifold carries a natural intrinsic metric, called the metric of Carnot–Carathéodory, defined as

$$d(x, y) = \inf\int_0^1 \sqrt{g(\dot\gamma(t),\dot\gamma(t))} \, dt,$$

where infimum is taken along all horizontal curves $\gamma: [0, 1] \to M$ such that $\gamma(0)=x$, $\gamma(1)=y$. Horizontal curves can be taken either Lipschitz continuous, absolutely continuous or in the Sobolev space $H^1([0,1],M)$ producing the same metric in all cases.

The fact that the distance between two points is always finite (i.e. any two points are connected by a horizontal curve) is a consequence of Hörmander's condition known as Chow–Rashevskii theorem.

== Examples ==
A position of a car on the plane is determined by three parameters: two coordinates $x$ and $y$ for the location and an angle $\alpha$ which describes the orientation of the car. Therefore, the position of the car can be described by a point in a manifold

$$\mathbb R^2\times S^1.$$

One can ask, what is the minimal distance one should drive to get from one position to another? This defines a Carnot–Carathéodory metric on the manifold

$$\mathbb R^2\times S^1.$$

A closely related example of a sub-Riemannian metric can be constructed on a Heisenberg group: Take two elements $\alpha$ and $\beta$ in the corresponding Lie algebra such that

$$\{ \alpha,\beta,[\alpha,\beta]\}$$

spans the entire algebra. The distribution $H$ spanned by left shifts of $\alpha$ and $\beta$ is completely non-integrable. Then choosing any smooth positive quadratic form on $H$ gives a sub-Riemannian metric on the group.

== Properties ==
For every sub-Riemannian manifold, there exists a Hamiltonian, called the sub-Riemannian Hamiltonian, constructed out of the metric for the manifold. Conversely, every such quadratic Hamiltonian induces a sub-Riemannian manifold.

Solutions of the corresponding Hamilton–Jacobi equations for the sub-Riemannian Hamiltonian are called geodesics, and generalize Riemannian geodesics.

== See also ==
- Carnot group, a class of Lie groups that form sub-Riemannian manifolds.
- Distribution
- Hörmander's condition
- Optimal control
