= Tautological bundle =

Vector bundle existing over a Grassmannian

In mathematics, the tautological bundle is a vector bundle occurring over a Grassmannian in a natural tautological way: for a Grassmannian of $k$-dimensional subspaces of $V$, given a point in the Grassmannian corresponding to a $k$-dimensional vector subspace $W \subseteq V$, the fiber over $W$ is the subspace $W$ itself. In the case of projective space the tautological bundle is known as the tautological line bundle.

The tautological bundle is also called the universal bundle since any vector bundle (over a compact space) is a pullback of the tautological bundle; this is to say a Grassmannian is a classifying space for vector bundles. Because of this, the tautological bundle is important in the study of characteristic classes.

Tautological bundles are constructed both in algebraic topology and in algebraic geometry. In algebraic geometry, the tautological line bundle (as invertible sheaf) is

$$\mathcal{O}_{\mathbb{P}^n}(-1),$$

the dual of the hyperplane bundle or Serre's twisting sheaf $\mathcal{O}_{\mathbb{P}^n}(1)$. The hyperplane bundle is the line bundle corresponding to the hyperplane (divisor) $\mathbb{P}^{n-1}$ in $\mathbb{P}^n$. The tautological line bundle and the hyperplane bundle are exactly the two generators of the Picard group of the projective space.

In Michael Atiyah's "K-theory", the tautological line bundle over a complex projective space is called the standard line bundle. The sphere bundle of the standard bundle is usually called the Hopf bundle. (cf. Bott generator.)

More generally, there are also tautological bundles on a projective bundle of a vector bundle, as well as a Grassmann bundle.

The older term canonical bundle has dropped out of favour, on the grounds that canonical is already a heavily overloaded term, in both mathematical terminology and confusion with the canonical class in algebraic geometry could scarcely be avoided.

== Intuitive definition ==
Grassmannians by definition are the parameter spaces for linear subspaces, of a given dimension, in a given vector space $W$. If $G$ is a Grassmannian, and $V_g$ is the subspace of $W$ corresponding to $g$ in $G$, this is already almost the data required for a vector bundle: namely a vector space for each point $g$, varying continuously. All that can stop the definition of the tautological bundle from this indication, is the difficulty that the $V_g$ are going to intersect. Fixing this up is a routine application of the disjoint union device, so that the bundle projection is from a total space made up of identical copies of the $V_g$, that now do not intersect. With this, we have the bundle.

The projective space case is included. By convention $P(V)$ may usefully carry the tautological bundle in the dual space sense. That is, with $V^*$ the dual space, points of $P(V)$ carry the vector subspaces of $V^*$ that are their kernels, when considered as (rays of) linear functionals on $V^*$. If $V$ has dimension $n+1$, the tautological line bundle is one tautological bundle, and the other, just described, is of rank $n$.

== Formal definition ==
Let $G_n(\R^{n+k})$ be the Grassmannian of n-dimensional vector subspaces in $\R^{n+k};$ as a set it is the set of all n-dimensional vector subspaces of $\R^{n+k}.$ For example, if n = 1, it is the real projective k-space.

We define the tautological bundle γ_{n, k} over $G_n(\R^{n+k})$ as follows. The total space of the bundle is the set of all pairs (V, v) consisting of a point V of the Grassmannian and a vector v in V; it is given the subspace topology of the Cartesian product $G_n(\R^{n+k}) \times \R^{n+k}.$ The projection map π is given by π(V, v) = V. If F is the pre-image of V under π, it is given a structure of a vector space by a(V, v) + b(V, w) = (V, av + bw). Finally, to see local triviality, given a point X in the Grassmannian, let U be the set of all V such that the orthogonal projection p onto X maps V isomorphically onto X, and then define

$$\begin{cases} \phi: \pi^{-1}(U) \to U\times X\subseteq  G_n(\R^{n+k}) \times X \\ \phi(V,v) = (V, p(v)) \end{cases}$$

which is clearly a homeomorphism. Hence, the result is a vector bundle of rank n.

The above definition continues to make sense if we replace $\R$ with the complex field $\C.$

By definition, the infinite Grassmannian $G_n$ is the direct limit of $G_n(\R^{n+k})$ as $k\to\infty.$ Taking the direct limit of the bundles γ_{n, k} gives the tautological bundle γ_{n} of $G_n.$ It is a universal bundle in the sense: for each compact space X, there is a natural bijection

$$\begin{cases} [X, G_n] \to \operatorname{Vect}^{\R}_n(X) \\ f \mapsto f^*(\gamma_n) \end{cases}$$

where on the left the bracket means homotopy class and on the right is the set of isomorphism classes of real vector bundles of rank n. The inverse map is given as follows: since X is compact, any vector bundle E is a subbundle of a trivial bundle: $E \hookrightarrow X \times \R^{n+k}$ for some k and so E determines a map

$$\begin{cases}f_E: X \to G_n \\ x \mapsto E_x \end{cases}$$

unique up to homotopy.

Remark: In turn, one can define a tautological bundle as a universal bundle; suppose there is a natural bijection

$$[X, G_n] = \operatorname{Vect}^{\R}_n(X)$$

for any paracompact space X. Since $G_n$ is the direct limit of compact spaces, it is paracompact and so there is a unique vector bundle over $G_n$ that corresponds to the identity map on $G_n.$ It is precisely the tautological bundle and, by restriction, one gets the tautological bundles over all $G_n(\R^{n+k}).$

== Hyperplane bundle ==
The hyperplane bundle H on a real projective k-space is defined as follows. The total space of H is the set of all pairs (L, f) consisting of a line L through the origin in $\R^{k+1}$ and f a linear functional on L. The projection map π is given by π(L, f) = L (so that the fiber over L is the dual vector space of L.) The rest is exactly like the tautological line bundle.

In other words, H is the dual bundle of the tautological line bundle.

In algebraic geometry, the hyperplane bundle is the line bundle (as invertible sheaf) corresponding to the hyperplane divisor

$$H = \mathbb{P}^{n-1} \sub \mathbb{P}^{n}$$

given as, say, x_{0} = 0, when x_{i} are the homogeneous coordinates. This can be seen as follows. If D is a (Weil) divisor on $X=\mathbb{P}^n,$ one defines the corresponding line bundle O(D) on X by

$$\Gamma(U, O(D)) = \{ f \in K | (f) + D \ge 0 \text{ on } U \}$$

where K is the field of rational functions on X. Taking D to be H, we have:

$$\begin{cases}O(H) \simeq O(1)\\ f \mapsto f x_0\end{cases}$$

where x_{0} is, as usual, viewed as a global section of the twisting sheaf O(1). (In fact, the above isomorphism is part of the usual correspondence between Weil divisors and Cartier divisors.) Finally, the dual of the twisting sheaf corresponds to the tautological line bundle (see below).

== Tautological line bundle in algebraic geometry ==
In algebraic geometry, this notion exists over any field k. The concrete definition is as follows. Let $A = k[y_0, \dots, y_n]$ and $\mathbb{P}^n = \operatorname{Proj}A$. Note that we have:

$$\mathbf{Spec} \left (\mathcal{O}_{\mathbb{P}^n}[x_0, \ldots, x_n] \right ) = \mathbb{A}^{n+1}_{\mathbb{P}^n} = \mathbb{A}^{n+1} \times_k {\mathbb{P}^n}$$

where Spec is relative Spec. Now, put:

$$L = \mathbf{Spec} \left (\mathcal{O}_{\mathbb{P}^n}[x_0, \dots, x_n]/I \right )$$

where I is the ideal sheaf generated by global sections $x_iy_j-x_jy_i$. Then L is a closed subscheme of $\mathbb{A}^{n+1}_{\mathbb{P}^n}$ over the same base scheme $\mathbb{P}^n$; moreover, the closed points of L are exactly those (x, y) of $\mathbb{A}^{n+1} \times_k \mathbb{P}^n$ such that either x is zero or the image of x in $\mathbb{P}^n$ is y. Thus, L is the tautological line bundle as defined before if k is the field of real or complex numbers.

In more concise terms, L is the blow-up of the origin of the affine space $\mathbb{A}^{n+1}$, where the locus x = 0 in L is the exceptional divisor. (cf. Hartshorne, Ch. I, the end of § 4.)

In general, $\mathbf{Spec}(\operatorname{Sym} \check{E})$ is the algebraic vector bundle corresponding to a locally free sheaf E of finite rank. Since we have the exact sequence:

$$0 \to I \to \mathcal{O}_{\mathbb{P}^n}[x_0, \ldots, x_n] \overset{x_i \mapsto y_i}{\longrightarrow} \operatorname{Sym} \mathcal{O}_{\mathbb{P}^n}(1) \to 0,$$

the tautological line bundle L, as defined above, corresponds to the dual $\mathcal{O}_{\mathbb{P}^n}(-1)$ of Serre's twisting sheaf. In practice both the notions (tautological line bundle and the dual of the twisting sheaf) are used interchangeably.

Over a field, its dual line bundle is the line bundle associated to the hyperplane divisor H, whose global sections are the linear forms. Its Chern class is −H. This is an example of an anti-ample line bundle. Over $\C,$ this is equivalent to saying that it is a negative line bundle, meaning that minus its Chern class is the de Rham class of the standard Kähler form.

== Facts ==
- The tautological line bundle γ_{1, k} is locally trivial but not trivial, for k ≥ 1. This remains true over other fields.

In fact, it is straightforward to show that, for k = 1, the real tautological line bundle is none other than the well-known bundle whose total space is the Möbius strip. For a full proof of the above fact, see.

- The Picard group of line bundles on $\mathbb{P}(V)$ is infinite cyclic, and the tautological line bundle is a generator.
- In the case of projective space, where the tautological bundle is a line bundle, the associated invertible sheaf of sections is $\mathcal{O}(-1)$, the tensor inverse (ie the dual vector bundle) of the hyperplane bundle or Serre twist sheaf $\mathcal{O}(1)$; in other words the hyperplane bundle is the generator of the Picard group having positive degree (as a divisor) and the tautological bundle is its opposite: the generator of negative degree.

== See also ==
- Hopf bundle
- Stiefel-Whitney class
- Euler sequence
- Chern class (Chern classes of tautological bundles is the algebraically independent generators of the cohomology ring of the infinite Grassmannian.)
- Borel's theorem
- Thom space (Thom spaces of tautological bundles γ_{n} as n →∞ is called the Thom spectrum.)
- Grassmann bundle

== Sources ==
- Atiyah, Michael Francis (1989), K-theory, Advanced Book Classics (2nd ed.), Addison-Wesley, ISBN 978-0-201-09394-0, MR 1043170
- Griffiths, Phillip; Harris, Joseph (1994), Principles of algebraic geometry (PDF), Wiley Classics Library, New York: John Wiley & Sons, doi:10.1002/9781118032527, ISBN 978-0-471-05059-9, MR 1288523.
- Hartshorne, Robin (1977), Algebraic Geometry, Berlin, New York: Springer-Verlag, ISBN 978-0-387-90244-9, MR 0463157, OCLC 13348052.
- Milnor, John W.; Stasheff, James D. (1974). Characteristic Classes. Annals of Mathematics Studies. Vol. 76. Princeton University Press; University of Tokyo Press. ISBN 978-0-691-08122-9. MR 0440554.
- Rubei, Elena (2014), Algebraic Geometry: A Concise Dictionary, Berlin/Boston: Walter De Gruyter, ISBN 978-3-11-031622-3
