= Contact bundle =

Bundle of linear subspaces of the tangent bundle

In differential geometry, a contact bundle is a particular type of fiber bundle constructed from a smooth manifold. Like how the tangent bundle is the manifold that describes the local behavior of parameterized curves, a contact bundle (of order 1) is the manifold that describes the local behavior of unparameterized curves. More generally, a contact bundle of order k is the manifold that describes the local behavior of k-dimensional submanifolds.

Since the contact bundle is obtained by combining Grassmannians of the tangent spaces at each point, it is a special case of the Grassmann bundle and of the projective bundle.

== Definition ==
$M$ is an $n$-dimensional smooth manifold. $TM$ is its tangent bundle. $T^* M$ is its cotangent bundle.

A contact element of order k at $p\in M$ is a $k$ plane $E\subset T_pM$. For $k=n-1$ these are hyperplanes.

Given a vector space $V$, the space of all k-dimensional subspaces of it is $\mathrm{Gr}_k(V)$. It is the Grassmannian.

The $k$-th contact bundle is the manifold of all order k contact elements:
$$C_k(M)=\bigsqcup_{p\in M}\mathrm{Gr}_k(T_pM)$$
with the projection $\pi:C_k(M)\to M$. This is a smooth fiber bundle with typical fiber $\mathrm{Gr}_k(\mathbb{R}^n)$. For $1\le k\le n-1$ this produces $n-1$ distinct bundles. At each point of $M$, the fiber is the space of all contact elements of order k through the point. $C_k(M)$ has dimension $n + (n-k) \times k$.

$C_k(M)$ can also be constructed as an associated bundle of the frame bundle:
$$\operatorname{Fr}(T M) \times_{G L(n, \mathbb{R})} \operatorname{Gr}_k\left(\mathbb{R}^n\right)$$
via the standard action of $G L(n, \mathbb{R})$ on $\operatorname{Gr}_k\left(\mathbb{R}^n\right)$. The scalar subgroup $\mathbb{R} \times I_{n \times n}$ acts trivially, so its (effective) structure group is the projective linear group $P G L(n, \mathbb{R})$. Note that they are all associated with the same principal $G L(n, \mathbb{R})$-bundle.

== Examples ==
When $k=1$, there is a canonical identification with the projectivized tangent bundle $\mathbb{P}(TM)$. It is also called the bundle of line elements. Each fiber $\mathrm{Gr}_1(\mathbb{R}^n)$ is naturally identified with $\mathbb{RP}^{\,n-1}$. If $M$ has a Riemannian metric, then its unit tangent bundle $UT(M)$ is a double cover of $C_1(M)$ by forgetting the sign.

When $k=n-1$, there is a natural identification with the projectivized cotangent bundle $\mathbb{P}(T^*M)$. In this case the total space carries a natural contact structure induced by the tautological 1-form on $T^*M$. In detail, a hyperplane $H\subset T_pM$ corresponds to a line of covectors in $T_p^*M$, each of whose kernel is $H$, giving $C_{n-1}(M)\cong \mathbb{P}(T^*M)$. It is also called the bundle of hyperplane elements.

== Contact structure ==
Around each point of $M$, construct local coordinate system $q^1, \dots, q^n$. Each contact element then induces a local atlas of $\binom{n}{k}$ coordinate systems. The first system is of form
$$\begin{bmatrix} I_{(n-k)\times(n-k)} | A \end{bmatrix}$$
, where $A$ is a matrix of shape $(n-k) \times k$. The others are obtained by permuting its columns.

Every k-dimensional submanifold of $M$ uniquely lifts to a k-dimensional submanifold of $C_k(M)$. This is a generalization of the Gauss map. However, not every k-dimensional submanifold of $C_k(M)$ is a lift of a k-dimensional submanifold of $M$. In fact, a k-dimensional submanifold of $C_k(M)$ is a lift of a k-dimensional submanifold of $M$ iff it is an integral manifold of a certain distribution in $C_k(M)$. This distribution is called the contact structure of $C_k(M)$.

In the special case where $k = n-1$, the contact structure is a distribution of hyperplanes with dimension $(2n-2)$ in the $(2n-1)$-dimensional manifold $C_{n-1}(M)$, and it is maximally non-integrable. In fact, "contact structure" usually refers to only distributions that are locally contactomorphic to this case of maximal non-integrability.

== See also ==
- Grassmannian
- Grassmann bundle
- Jet bundle
- Projectivization
- Contact geometry
