= Frobenius theorem (differential topology) =

On finding a maximal set of solutions of a system of first-order homogeneous linear PDEs

The 1-form dz − y dx. on R^{3} maximally violates the assumption of Frobenius' theorem. These planes appear to twist along the y-axis. It is not integrable, as can be verified by drawing an infinitesimal square in the x-y plane, and follow the path along the one-forms. The path would not return to the same z-coordinate after one circuit.

In mathematics, Frobenius' theorem gives necessary and sufficient conditions for finding a maximal set of independent solutions of an overdetermined system of first-order homogeneous linear partial differential equations. In modern geometric terms, given a family of vector fields, the theorem gives necessary and sufficient integrability conditions for the existence of a foliation by maximal integral manifolds whose tangent bundles are spanned by the given vector fields. The theorem generalizes the existence theorem for ordinary differential equations, which guarantees that a single vector field always gives rise to integral curves; Frobenius gives compatibility conditions under which the integral curves of r vector fields mesh into coordinate grids on r-dimensional integral manifolds. The theorem is foundational in differential topology and calculus on manifolds.

Contact geometry studies 1-forms that maximally violate the assumptions of Frobenius' theorem. An example is shown on the right.

== Introduction ==
=== One-form version ===
Suppose we are to find the trajectory of a particle in a subset of 3D space, but we do not know its trajectory formula. Instead, we know only that its trajectory satisfies $adx + bdy + cdz = 0$, where $a, b, c$ are smooth functions of $(x,y,z)$. Thus, our only certainty is that if at some moment in time the particle is at location $(x_0, y_0, z_0)$, then its velocity at that moment is restricted within the plane with equation
$$a(x_0, y_0, z_0)[x-x_0] + b(x_0, y_0, z_0)[y-y_0] + c(x_0, y_0, z_0)[z-z_0] = 0$$

In other words, we can draw a "local plane" at each point in 3D space, and we know that the particle's trajectory must be tangent to the local plane at all times.

If we have two equations
$$\begin{cases}
adx + bdy + cdz = 0 \\
a'dx + b'dy + c'dz = 0
\end{cases}$$
then we can draw two local planes at each point, and their intersection is generically a line, allowing us to uniquely solve for the curve starting at any point. In other words, with two 1-forms, we can foliate the domain into curves.

If we have only one equation $adx + bdy + cdz = 0$, then we might be able to foliate $\R^3$ into surfaces, in which case, we can be sure that a curve starting at a certain surface must be restricted to wander within that surface. If not, then a curve starting at any point might end up at any other point in $\R^3$.

One can imagine starting with a cloud of little planes, and quilting them together to form a full surface. The main danger is that, if we quilt the little planes two at a time, we might go on a cycle and return to where we began, but shifted by a small amount. If this happens, then we would not get a 2-dimensional surface, but a 3-dimensional blob. An example is shown in the diagram on the right.

If the one-form is integrable, then loops exactly close upon themselves, and each surface would be 2-dimensional. Frobenius' theorem states that this happens precisely when $\omega \wedge d\omega = 0$ over all of the domain, where $\omega := adx + bdy + cdz$. The notation is defined in the article on one-forms.

During his development of axiomatic thermodynamics, Carathéodory proved that if $\omega$ is an integrable one-form on an open subset of $\R^n$, then $\omega = f dg$ for some scalar functions $f, g$ on the subset. This is usually called Carathéodory's theorem in axiomatic thermodynamics. One can prove this intuitively by first constructing the little planes according to $\omega$, quilting them together into a foliation, then assigning each surface in the foliation with a scalar label. Now for each point $p$, define $g(p)$ to be the scalar label of the surface containing point $p$.

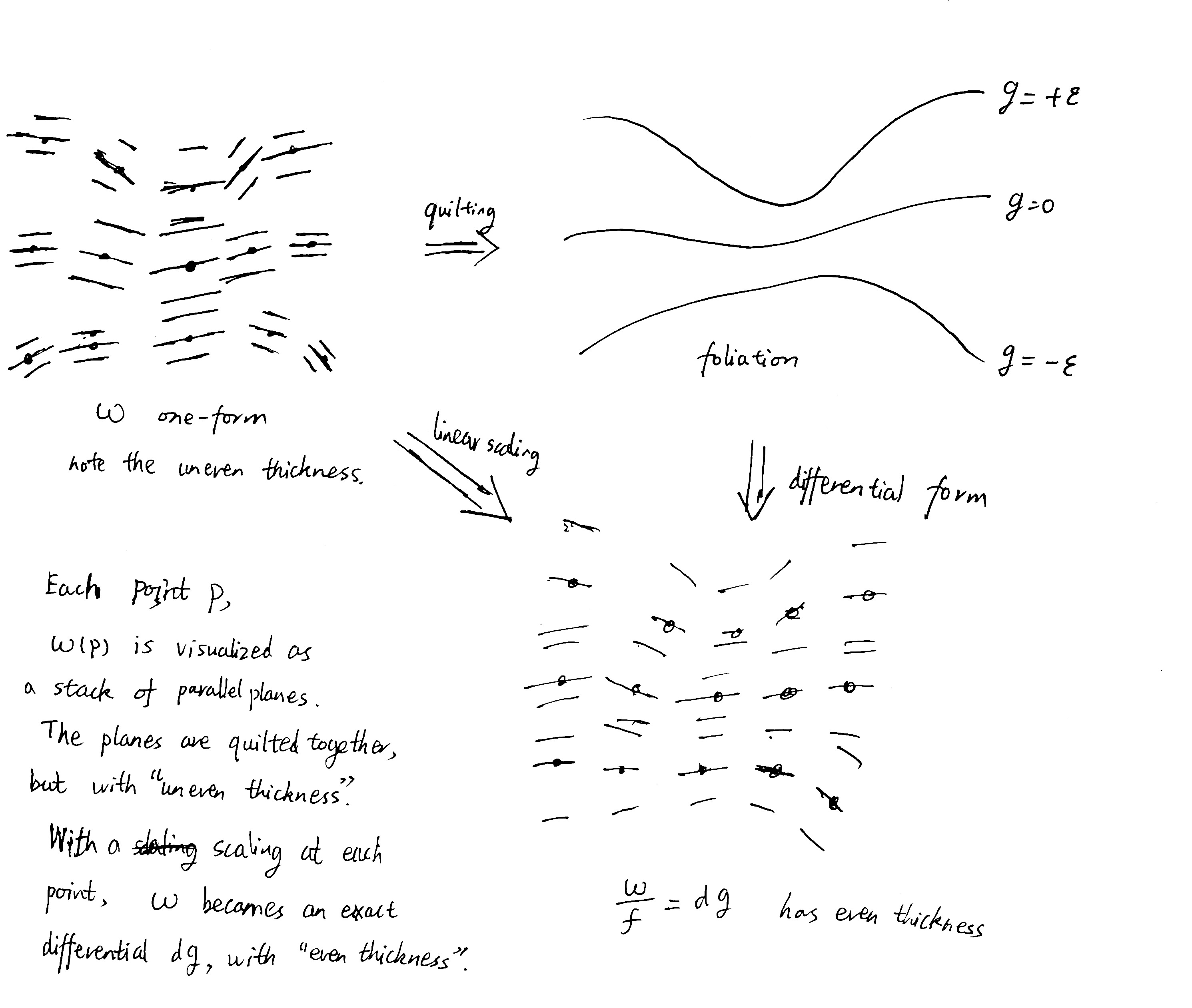
For each point p, the one-form $\omega(p)$ is visualized as a stack of parallel planes. The planes are quilted together, but with "uneven thickness". With a scaling at each point, $\omega$ would have "even thickness", and become an exact differential.

Now, $dg$ is a one-form that has exactly the same planes as $\omega$. However, it has "even thickness" everywhere, while $\omega$ might have "uneven thickness". This can be fixed by a scalar scaling by $f$, giving $\omega = f dg$. This is illustrated on the right.

=== Multiple one-forms ===
In its most elementary form, the theorem addresses the problem of finding a maximal set of independent solutions of a regular system of first-order linear homogeneous partial differential equations. Let

$$\left \{ f_k^i : \mathbf{R}^n \to \mathbf{R} \ : \ 1 \leq i \leq n, 1 \leq k \leq r \right \}$$

be a collection of C^{1} functions, with r < n, and such that the matrix ( f^{i}_{k} ) has rank r when evaluated at any point of R^{n}. Consider the following system of partial differential equations for a C^{2} function u : R^{n} → R:

$$(1) \quad \begin{cases}
L_1u\ \stackrel{\mathrm{def}}{=}\ \sum_i f_1^i(x)\frac{\partial u}{\partial x^i} = \vec f_1 \cdot \nabla u = 0\\
L_2u\ \stackrel{\mathrm{def}}{=}\ \sum_i f_2^i(x)\frac{\partial u}{\partial x^i} = \vec f_2 \cdot \nabla u = 0\\
\qquad \cdots \\
L_ru\ \stackrel{\mathrm{def}}{=}\ \sum_i f_r^i(x)\frac{\partial u}{\partial x^i} = \vec f_r \cdot \nabla u = 0
\end{cases}$$

One seeks conditions on the existence of a collection of solutions u_{1}, ..., u_{n−r} such that the gradients ∇u_{1}, ..., ∇u_{n−r} are linearly independent.

The Frobenius theorem asserts that this problem admits a solution locally if, and only if, the operators L_{k} satisfy a certain integrability condition known as involutivity. Specifically, they must satisfy relations of the form

$$L_iL_ju(x)-L_jL_iu(x)=\sum_k c_{ij}^k(x)L_ku(x)$$

for 1 ≤ i, j ≤ r, and all C^{2} functions u, and for some coefficients c^{k}_{ij}(x) that are allowed to depend on x. In other words, the commutators [L_{i}, L_{j}] must lie in the linear span of the L_{k} at every point. The involutivity condition is a generalization of the commutativity of partial derivatives. In fact, the strategy of proof of the Frobenius theorem is to form linear combinations among the operators L_{i} so that the resulting operators do commute, and then to show that there is a coordinate system y_{i} for which these are precisely the partial derivatives with respect to y_{1}, ..., y_{r}.

=== From analysis to geometry ===
Even though the system is overdetermined there are typically infinitely many solutions. For example, the system of differential equations

$$\begin{cases} \frac{\partial f}{\partial x} + \frac{\partial f}{\partial y} =0\\ \frac{\partial f}{\partial y}+ \frac{\partial f}{\partial z}=0
\end{cases}$$

clearly permits multiple solutions. Nevertheless, these solutions still have enough structure that they may be completely described. The first observation is that, even if f_{1} and f_{2} are two different solutions, the level surfaces of f_{1} and f_{2} must overlap. In fact, the level surfaces for this system are all planes in R^{3} of the form x − y + z = C, for C a constant. The second observation is that, once the level surfaces are known, all solutions can then be given in terms of an arbitrary function. Since the value of a solution f on a level surface is constant by definition, define a function C(t) by:

$$f(x,y,z)=C(t) \text{ whenever } x - y + z = t.$$

Conversely, if a function C(t) is given, then each function f given by this expression is a solution of the original equation. Thus, because of the existence of a family of level surfaces, solutions of the original equation are in a one-to-one correspondence with arbitrary functions of one variable.

Frobenius' theorem allows one to establish a similar such correspondence for the more general case of solutions of (1). Suppose that u_{1}, ..., u_{n−r} are solutions of the problem (1) satisfying the independence condition on the gradients. Consider the level sets of (u_{1}, ..., u_{n−r}) as functions with values in R^{n−r}. If v_{1}, ..., v_{n−r} is another such collection of solutions, one can show (using some linear algebra and the mean value theorem) that this has the same family of level sets but with a possibly different choice of constants for each set. Thus, even though the independent solutions of (1) are not unique, the equation (1) nonetheless determines a unique family of level sets. Just as in the case of the example, general solutions u of (1) are in a one-to-one correspondence with (continuously differentiable) functions on the family of level sets.

The level sets corresponding to the maximal independent solution sets of (1) are called the integral manifolds because functions on the collection of all integral manifolds correspond in some sense to constants of integration. Once one of these constants of integration is known, then the corresponding solution is also known.

== Frobenius' theorem in modern language ==
The Frobenius theorem can be restated more economically in modern language. Frobenius' original version of the theorem was stated in terms of Pfaffian systems, which today can be translated into the language of differential forms. An alternative formulation, which is somewhat more intuitive, uses vector fields.

=== Formulation using vector fields ===
In the vector field formulation, the theorem states that a subbundle of the tangent bundle of a manifold is integrable (or involutive) if and only if it arises from a regular foliation. In this context, the Frobenius theorem relates integrability to foliation; to state the theorem, both concepts must be clearly defined.

One begins by noting that an arbitrary smooth vector field $X$ on a manifold $M$ defines a family of curves, its integral curves $u:I\to M$ (for intervals $I$). These are the solutions of $\dot u(t) = X_{u(t)}$, which is a system of first-order ordinary differential equations, whose solvability is guaranteed by the Picard–Lindelöf theorem. If the vector field $X$ is nowhere zero then it defines a one-dimensional subbundle of the tangent bundle of $M$, and the integral curves form a regular foliation of $M$. Thus, one-dimensional subbundles are always integrable.

If the subbundle has dimension greater than one, a condition needs to be imposed. One says that a subbundle $E\subset TM$ of the tangent bundle $TM$ is integrable (or involutive), if, for any two vector fields $X$ and $Y$ taking values in $E$, the Lie bracket $[X,Y]$ takes values in $E$ as well. This notion of integrability need only be defined locally; that is, the existence of the vector fields $X$ and $Y$ and their integrability need only be defined on subsets of $M$.

Several definitions of foliation exist. Here we use the following:

Definition. A p-dimensional, class C^{r} foliation of an n-dimensional manifold M is a decomposition of M into a union of disjoint connected submanifolds {L_{α}}_{α∈A}, called the leaves of the foliation, with the following property: Every point in M has a neighborhood U and a system of local, class C^{r} coordinates x=(x^{1}, ⋅⋅⋅, x^{n}) : U→R^{n} such that for each leaf L_{α}, the components of U ∩ L_{α} are described by the equations x^{p+1}=constant, ⋅⋅⋅, x^{n}=constant. A foliation is denoted by $\mathcal{F}$={L_{α}}_{α∈A}.

Trivially, any foliation of $M$ defines an integrable subbundle, since if $p\in M$ and $N\subset M$ is the leaf of the foliation passing through $p$ then $E_p = T_pN$ is integrable. Frobenius' theorem states that the converse is also true:

Given the above definitions, Frobenius' theorem states that a subbundle $E$ is integrable if and only if the subbundle $E$ arises from a regular foliation of $M$.

=== Differential forms formulation ===
Let U be an open set in a manifold M, Ω^{1}(U) be the space of smooth, differentiable 1-forms on U, and F be a submodule of Ω^{1}(U) of rank r, the rank being constant in value over U. The Frobenius theorem states that F is integrable if and only if for every p in U the stalk F_{p} is generated by r exact differential forms.

Geometrically, the theorem states that an integrable module of 1-forms of rank r is the same thing as a codimension-r foliation. The correspondence to the definition in terms of vector fields given in the introduction follows from the close relationship between differential forms and Lie derivatives. Frobenius' theorem is one of the basic tools for the study of vector fields and foliations.

There are thus two forms of the theorem: one which operates with distributions, that is smooth subbundles D of the tangent bundle TM; and the other which operates with subbundles of the graded ring Ω(M) of all forms on M. These two forms are related by duality. If D is a smooth tangent distribution on M, then the annihilator of D, I(D) consists of all forms $\alpha\in\Omega^k (M)$ (for any $k\in \{1,\dots, \operatorname{dim}M\}$) such that

$$\alpha(v_1,\dots,v_k) = 0$$

for all $v_1,\dots,v_k\in D$. The set I(D) forms a subring and, in fact, an ideal in Ω(M). Furthermore, using the definition of the exterior derivative, it can be shown that I(D) is closed under exterior differentiation (it is a differential ideal) if and only if D is involutive. Consequently, the Frobenius theorem takes on the equivalent form that I(D) is closed under exterior differentiation if and only if D is integrable.

== Generalizations ==
The theorem may be generalized in a variety of ways.

=== Infinite dimensions ===
One infinite-dimensional generalization is as follows. Let X and Y be Banach spaces, and A ⊂ X, B ⊂ Y a pair of open sets. Let

$$F:A\times B \to L(X,Y)$$

be a continuously differentiable function of the Cartesian product (which inherits a differentiable structure from its inclusion into X ×Y ) into the space L(X,Y) of continuous linear transformations of X into Y. A differentiable mapping u : A → B is a solution of the differential equation

$$(1) \quad y' = F(x,y)$$

if

$$\forall x \in A: \quad u'(x) = F(x, u(x)).$$

The equation (1) is completely integrable if for each $(x_0, y_0)\in A\times B$, there is a neighborhood U of x_{0} such that (1) has a unique solution u(x) defined on U such that u(x_{0})=y_{0}.

The conditions of the Frobenius theorem depend on whether the underlying field is R or C. If it is R, then assume F is continuously differentiable. If it is C, then assume F is twice continuously differentiable. Then (1) is completely integrable at each point of A × B if and only if

$$D_1F(x,y)\cdot(s_1,s_2) + D_2F(x,y)\cdot(F(x,y)\cdot s_1,s_2) = D_1F(x,y) \cdot (s_2,s_1) + D_2F(x,y)\cdot(F(x,y)\cdot s_2,s_1)$$

for all s_{1}, s_{2} ∈ X. Here D_{1} (resp. D_{2}) denotes the partial derivative with respect to the first (resp. second) variable; the dot product denotes the action of the linear operator F(x, y) ∈ L(X, Y), as well as the actions of the operators D_{1}F(x, y) ∈ L(X, L(X, Y)) and D_{2}F(x, y) ∈ L(Y, L(X, Y)).

==== Banach manifolds ====
The infinite-dimensional version of the Frobenius theorem also holds on Banach manifolds. The statement is essentially the same as the finite-dimensional version.

Let M be a Banach manifold of class at least C^{2}. Let E be a subbundle of the tangent bundle of M. The bundle E is involutive if, for each point p ∈ M and pair of sections X and Y of E defined in a neighborhood of p, the Lie bracket of X and Y evaluated at p, lies in E_{p}:

$$[X,Y]_p \in E_p$$

On the other hand, E is integrable if, for each p ∈ M, there is an immersed submanifold φ : N → M whose image contains p, such that the differential of φ is an isomorphism of TN with φ^{−1}E.

The Frobenius theorem states that a subbundle E is integrable if and only if it is involutive.

=== Holomorphic forms ===
The statement of the theorem remains true for holomorphic 1-forms on complex manifolds — manifolds over C with biholomorphic transition functions.

Specifically, if $\omega^1,\dots,\omega^r$ are r linearly independent holomorphic 1-forms on an open set in C^{n} such that

$$d\omega^j = \sum_{i=1}^r \psi_i^j \wedge \omega^i$$

for some system of holomorphic 1-forms ψ^{j}_{i}, 1 ≤ i, j ≤ r, then there exist holomorphic functions f_{i}^{j} and g^{i} such that, on a possibly smaller domain,

$$\omega^j = \sum_{i=1}^r f_i^jdg^i.$$

This result holds locally in the same sense as the other versions of the Frobenius theorem. In particular, the fact that it has been stated for domains in C^{n} is not restrictive.

=== Higher degree forms ===
The statement does not generalize to higher degree forms, although there is a number of partial results such as Darboux's theorem and the Cartan-Kähler theorem.

== History ==
Despite being named for Ferdinand Georg Frobenius, the theorem was first proven by Alfred Clebsch and Feodor Deahna. Deahna was the first to establish the sufficient conditions for the theorem, and Clebsch developed the necessary conditions. Frobenius is responsible for applying the theorem to Pfaffian systems, thus paving the way for its usage in differential topology.

== Applications ==
- In classical mechanics, the integrability of a system's constraint equations determines whether the system is holonomic or nonholonomic.
- In microeconomic theory, Frobenius' theorem can be used to prove the existence of a solution to the problem of integrability of demand functions.

=== Carathéodory's axiomatic thermodynamics ===
In classical thermodynamics, Frobenius' theorem can be used to construct entropy and temperature in Carathéodory's formalism.

Specifically, Carathéodory considered a thermodynamic system (concretely one can imagine a piston of gas) that can interact with the outside world by either heat conduction (such as setting the piston on fire) or mechanical work (pushing on the piston). He then defined "adiabatic process" as any process that the system may undergo without heat conduction, and defined a relation of "adiabatic accessibility" thus: if the system can go from state A to state B after an adiabatic process, then $B$ is adiabatically accessible from $A$. Write it as $A \succeq B$.

Now assume that

- For any pair of states $A, B$, at least one of $A \succeq B$ and $B \succeq A$ holds.
- For any state $A$, and any neighborhood of $A$, there exists a state $B$ in the neighborhood, such that $B$ is adiabatically inaccessible from $A$.

Then, we can foliate the state space into subsets of states that are mutually adiabatically accessible. With mild assumptions on the smoothness of $\succeq$, each subset is a manifold of codimension 1. Call these manifolds "adiabatic surfaces".

By the first law of thermodynamics, there exists a scalar function $U$ ("internal energy") on the state space, such that
$$dU = \delta W + \delta Q = \sum_i X_i dx_i + \delta Q$$
where $X_1 dx_1, ..., X_n dx_n$ are the possible ways to perform mechanical work on the system. For example, if the system is a tank of ideal gas, then $\delta W = -p dV$.

Now, define the one-form on the state space
$$\omega := dU - \sum_i X_i dx_i$$
Now, since the adiabatic surfaces are tangent to $\omega$ at every point in state space, $\omega$ is integrable, so by Carathéodory's theorem, there exists two scalar functions $T, S$ on state space, such that $\omega = TdS$. These are the temperature and entropy functions, up to a multiplicative constant.

By plugging in the ideal gas laws, and noting that Joule expansion is an (irreversible) adiabatic process, we can fix the sign of $dS$, and find that $A \succeq B$ means $S(A) \leq S(B)$. That is, entropy is preserved in reversible adiabatic processes, and increases during irreversible adiabatic processes.

== See also ==
- Integrability conditions for differential systems
- Domain-straightening theorem
- Newlander–Nirenberg theorem
