= Euler sequence =

Short exact sequence of sheaves on projective space

In mathematics, the Euler sequence is a particular exact sequence of sheaves on n-dimensional projective space over a ring. It shows that the sheaf of relative differentials is stably isomorphic to an $(n+1)$-fold sum of the dual of the Serre twisting sheaf.

The Euler sequence generalizes to that of a projective bundle as well as a Grassmann bundle (see the latter article for this generalization.)

== Statement ==
Let $\mathbb{P}^n_A$ be the n-dimensional projective space over a commutative ring A. Let $\Omega^1 = \Omega^1_{\mathbb P^n_A/A}$ be the sheaf of 1-differentials on this space, and so on. The Euler sequence is the following exact sequence of sheaves on $\mathbb{P}^n_A$:

$$0 \longrightarrow \Omega^1 \longrightarrow \mathcal{O}(-1)^{\oplus (n+1)} \longrightarrow \mathcal{O} \longrightarrow 0.$$

The sequence can be constructed by defining a homomorphism $S(-1)^{\oplus n+1} \to S, e_i \mapsto x_i$ with $S = A[x_0, \ldots, x_n]$ and $e_i = 1$ in degree 1, surjective in degrees $\geq 1$, and checking that locally on the $n+1$ standard charts, the kernel is isomorphic to the relative differential module.

== Geometric interpretation ==
We assume that A is a field k.

The exact sequence above is dual to the sequence

$$0 \longrightarrow \mathcal O \longrightarrow \mathcal O (1)^{\oplus (n+1)} \longrightarrow \mathcal T \longrightarrow 0$$,

where $\mathcal T$ is the tangent sheaf of $\mathbb{P}^n$.

Let us explain the coordinate-free version of this sequence, on $\mathbb{P} V$ for an $(n+1)$-dimensional vector space V over k:

$$0\longrightarrow  \mathcal O_{\mathbb{P} V} \longrightarrow \mathcal O_{\mathbb{P} V}(1)\otimes V \longrightarrow \mathcal T_{\mathbb{P} V} \longrightarrow 0.$$

This sequence is most easily understood by interpreting sections of the central term as 1-homogeneous vector fields on V. One such section, the Euler vector field, associates to each point $v$ of the variety $V$ the tangent vector $v$. This vector field is radial in the sense that it vanishes uniformly on 0-homogeneous functions, that is, the functions that are invariant by homothetic rescaling, or "independent of the radial coordinate".

A function (defined on some open set) on $\mathbb P V$ gives rise by pull-back to a 0-homogeneous function on V (again partially defined). We obtain 1-homogeneous vector fields by multiplying the Euler vector field by such functions. This is the definition of the first map, and its injectivity is immediate.

The second map is related to the notion of derivation, equivalent to that of vector field. Recall that a vector field on an open set U of the projective space $\mathbb{P} V$ can be defined as a derivation of the functions defined on this open set. Pulled-back in V, this is equivalent to a derivation on the preimage of U that preserves 0-homogeneous functions. Any vector field on $\mathbb{P} V$ can be thus obtained, and the defect of injectivity of this mapping consists precisely of the radial vector fields.

Therefore the kernel of the second morphism equals the image of the first one.

== The canonical line bundle of projective spaces ==
By taking the highest exterior power, one sees that the canonical sheaf of a projective space is given by
$$\omega_{\mathbb{P}^n_A/A} = \mathcal{O}_{\mathbb{P}^n_A}(-(n+1)).$$
In particular, projective spaces are Fano varieties, because the canonical bundle is anti-ample and this line bundle has no non-zero global sections, so the geometric genus is 0. This can be found by looking at the Euler sequence and plugging it into the determinant formula
$$\det(\mathcal{E}) = \det(\mathcal{E}') \otimes \det(\mathcal{E}'')$$
for any short exact sequence of the form $0 \to \mathcal{E}' \to \mathcal{E} \to \mathcal{E}''\to 0$.

== Chern classes ==
The Euler sequence can be used to compute the Chern classes of projective space. Recall that given a short exact sequence of coherent sheaves,
$$0 \to \mathcal{E}' \to \mathcal{E} \to \mathcal{E}''\to 0,$$
we can compute the total Chern class of $\mathcal{E}$ with the formula $c(\mathcal{E}) = c(\mathcal{E}')\cdot c(\mathcal{E}'')$. For example, on $\mathbb{P}^2$ we find
$$\begin{align}
c(\Omega^1_{\mathbb{P}^2}) &= \frac{c(\mathcal{O}(-1)^{\oplus (2+1)})}{c(\mathcal{O})} \\
&= (1 - [H])^3 \\
&= 1 - 3[H] + 3[H]^2 - [H]^3 \\
&= 1 - 3[H] + 3[H]^2,
\end{align}$$
where $[H]$ represents the hyperplane class in the Chow ring $A^\bullet(\mathbb{P}^2)$. Using the exact sequence
$$0 \to \Omega^2 \to \mathcal{O}(-2)^{\oplus 3} \to \Omega^1 \to 0,$$
we can again use the total Chern class formula to find
$$\begin{align}
c(\Omega^2) &= \frac{c(\mathcal{O}(-2)^{\oplus 3})}{c(\Omega^1)} \\
&= \frac{(1 - 2[H])^3}{1 - 3[H] + 3[H]^2}.
\end{align}$$
Since we need to invert the polynomial in the denominator, this is equivalent to finding a power series $a([H]) = a_0 + a_1[H] + a_2[H]^2 +a_3[H]^3 + \cdots$ such that $a([H])c(\Omega^1) = 1$.
