= Paul Malliavin =

French mathematician (1925–2010)

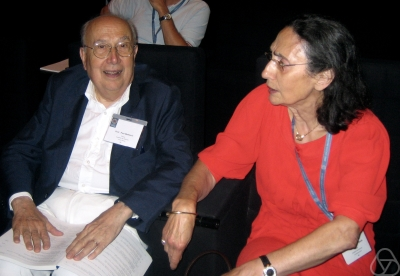
- Paul Malliavin at the ICM 2006 in Madrid, with his wife Marie-Paule Malliavin
- Born: September 10, 1925; Neuilly-sur-Seine
- Died: June 3, 2010 (aged 84); Paris
- Education: University of Paris
- Known for: Malliavin derivative Malliavin's absolute continuity lemma Malliavin calculus Probabilistic proof of Hörmander's theorem
- Awards: Servant Prize (1972) Prix Gaston Julia Prize (1974)
- Scientific career
- Fields: Mathematics
- Workplaces: Pierre and Marie Curie University
- Doctoral advisor: Szolem Mandelbrojt
- Doctoral students: María Emilia Caballero; Ana Bela Cruzeiro

Paul Malliavin (French: [maljavɛ̃]; September 10, 1925 – June 3, 2010) was a French mathematician who made important contributions to harmonic analysis and stochastic analysis. He is known for the Malliavin calculus, an infinite-dimensional calculus for functionals on the Wiener space, and his probabilistic proof of Hörmander’s theorem. He was Professor at the Pierre and Marie Curie University and a member of the French Academy of Sciences from 1979 to 2010.

== Personal life ==
Malliavin was the son of René Malliavin, also known as Michel Dacier, a political writer and journalist, and Madeleine Delavenne, a physician. On 27 April 1965 he married Marie-Paule Brameret, who was also a mathematician and with whom he published several mathematical papers. They had two children.

== Scientific contributions ==
Malliavin's early work was in harmonic analysis, where he derived important results on the spectral synthesis problem, providing definitive answers to fundamental questions in this field, including a complete characterization of 'band-limited' functions whose Fourier transform has compact support, known as the Beurling-Malliavin theorem.

In stochastic analysis, Malliavin is known for his work on the stochastic calculus of variation, now known as the Malliavin calculus, a mathematical theory which has found many applications in Monte Carlo simulation and mathematical finance.

As stated by Stroock and Yor: "Like Norbert Wiener, Paul Malliavin came to probability theory from harmonic analysis, and, like Wiener, his analytic origins were apparent in everything he did there." Malliavin introduced a differential operator on Wiener space, now called the Malliavin derivative, and derived an integration by parts formula for Wiener functionals. Using this integration by parts formula, Malliavin initiated a probabilistic approach to Hörmander's theorem for hypo-elliptic operators and gave a condition for the existence of smooth densities for Wiener functionals in terms of their Malliavin covariance matrix.

== Selected publications ==
- La quasi-analyticité généralisée sur un intervalle borné, Annales scientifiques de l’École Normale Supérieure 3^{e} série 72, 1955, pp. 93–110
- Impossibilité de la synthèse spectrale sur les groupes abéliens non compacts, Publications Mathématiques de l’IHÉS 2, 1959, pp. 61–68
- Calcul symbolique et sous-algèbres de L_{1}(G), Bulletin de la Société Mathématique de France 87, 1959, pp. 181–186, suite, pp. 187–190
- with Lee A. Rubel: On small entire functions of exponential type with given zeros, Bulletin de la Société Mathématique de France 89, 1961, pp. 175–206
- Spectre des fonctions moyenne-périodiques. Totalité d’une suite d’exponentielles sur un segment, Séminaire Lelong. Analyse 3 Exposé No. 11, 1961
- Un théorème taubérien relié aux estimations de valeurs propres, Séminaire Jean Leray, 1962–1963, pp. 224–231
- Malliavin, Paul (1972). Géométrie différentielle intrinsèque. Paris: Hermann. ISBN 978-2-7056-5696-6.
- Géométrie riemannienne stochastique, Séminaire Jean Leray 2 Exposé No. 1, 1973–1974
- Malliavin, Paul (1978). "Stochastic calculus of variations and hypoelliptic operators". Proceedings of the International Symposium on Stochastic Differential Equations (Res. Inst. Math. Sci., Kyoto Univ., Kyoto, 1976). New York: Wiley. pp. 195–263. MR 0536013
- Geometrie differentielle stochastique, Presses de l’Universite de Montreal, 1978
- with Hélène Airault, Leslie Kay, Gérard Letac: Integration and Probability, Springer, 1995
- with H. Airault: Some heat operators on P(R^{d}), Annales mathématiques Blaise Pascal 3 no. 1, 1996, pp. 1–11
- Stochastic Analysis, Springer, 1997
- Malliavin, Paul; Thalmaier, Anton (2005). Stochastic Calculus of Variations in Mathematical Finance. Springer. ISBN 978-3-540-43431-3.
