= Cruzeiro =

Cruzeiro, generally the Portuguese language term for a large cross, may refer to:

== Places ==
=== Brazil ===
- Cruzeiro, Belo Horizonte, a neighborhood of Belo Horizonte, near Savassi
- Cruzeiro, Federal District, an administrative region of the Federal District
- Cruzeiro, São Paulo, a city in the state of São Paulo, Brazil

=== Portugal ===
- Cruzeiro (Olhalvo), a locality in Olhalvo, Alenquer

== Football clubs ==
- C.D. Cruzeiro, a Salvadoran football team from the city of San Cayetano Istepeque, San Vicente
- Cruzeiro Esporte Clube, a Brazilian football team from the city of Belo Horizonte, Minas Gerais
- Cruzeiro Esporte Clube (PB), a Brazilian football team from the city of Itaporanga, Paraíba
- Cruzeiro Esporte Clube (RO), a Brazilian football team from the city of Porto Velho, Rondônia
- Cruzeiro Futebol Clube (BA), a Brazilian football team from the city of Cruz das Almas, Bahia
- Esporte Clube Cruzeiro, a Brazilian football team from the state of Rio Grande do Sul

== Other uses ==
- Ana Bela Cruzeiro (born 1957), Portuguese and Swiss mathematician
- O Cruzeiro, or simply Cruzeiro, a Brazilian magazine
- Brazilian cruzeiro (disambiguation), former currency of Brazil
- Serviços Aéreos Cruzeiro do Sul, or simply Cruzeiro, a defunct airline of Brazil
