= María Emilia Caballero =

Mexican mathematician

María Emilia Caballero Acosta is a Mexican mathematician specializing in probability theory, including Lévy processes, branching processes, Markov processes, and Lamperti representations (an exponential relation between Markov processes and Lévy processes). She is a professor in the Faculty of Sciences and Researcher in the Institute of Sciences of the National Autonomous University of Mexico (UNAM).

== Education and career ==
After doing her undergraduate studies at the National Autonomous University of Mexico, Caballero went to Pierre and Marie Curie University in France for graduate study in mathematics. She completed a doctorat de troisième cycle in 1973, with the dissertation Quelques proprietes en theorie du potentiel in potential theory, jointly supervised by Marcel Brelot and Paul Malliavin. Her interest in probability theory developed out of this work and the probabilistic theory of potential.

Already in 1964, she had begun working as an adjunct professor at the Escuela Nacional Preparatoria and as an assistant in the Faculty of Sciences at UNAM. On completing her doctorate in 1973, she took her present position at the Institute of Mathematics.

== Recognition ==
Caballero is a member of the Mexican Academy of Sciences. She won UNAM's Juana de Asbaje Medal in 2004. In 2012 she won UNAM's National University Award, the first woman in the Institute of Mathematics to win this award.
