= Feodor Deahna =

German mathematician

Heinrich Wilhelm Feodor Deahna (8 July 1815 – 8 January 1844) was a German mathematician. He is known for providing proof of what is now known as Frobenius theorem in differential topology, which he published in Crelle's Journal in 1840.

Deahna was born near Bayreuth on July 8, 1815, and was a student at the University of Göttingen in 1834. In 1843 he became an assistant mathematics teacher at the Fulda Gymnasium, but he died soon afterwards in Fulda, on January 8, 1844.

== Selected works ==
- Deahna, F. "Über die Bedingungen der Integrabilitat ....", J. Reine Angew. Math. 20 (1840) 340-350.
