= Malliavin's absolute continuity lemma =

Result in measure theory

In mathematics — specifically, in measure theory — Malliavin's absolute continuity lemma is a result due to the French mathematician Paul Malliavin that plays a foundational rôle in the regularity (smoothness) theorems of the Malliavin calculus. Malliavin's lemma gives a sufficient condition for a finite Borel measure to be absolutely continuous with respect to Lebesgue measure.

== Statement of the lemma ==
Let μ be a finite Borel measure on n-dimensional Euclidean space R^{n}. Suppose that, for every x ∈ R^{n}, there exists a constant C = C(x) such that

$$\left| \int_{\mathbf{R}^{n}} \mathrm{D} \varphi (y) (x) \, \mathrm{d} \mu(y) \right| \leq C(x) \| \varphi \|_{\infty}$$

for every C^{∞} function φ : R^{n} → R with compact support. Then μ is absolutely continuous with respect to n-dimensional Lebesgue measure λ^{n} on R^{n}. In the above, Dφ(y) denotes the Fréchet derivative of φ at y and ||φ||_{∞} denotes the supremum norm of φ.
