= Cartan–Kuranishi prolongation theorem =

In mathematics, given an exterior differential system defined on a manifold M, the Cartan–Kuranishi prolongation theorem says that after a finite number of prolongations the system is either in involution (admits at least one 'large' integral manifold), or is impossible.

== History ==
The theorem is named after Élie Cartan and Masatake Kuranishi. Cartan made several attempts in 1946 to prove the result, but it was in 1957 that Kuranishi provided a proof of Cartan's conjecture.

== Applications ==
This theorem is used in infinite-dimensional Lie theory.

== See also ==
- Cartan-Kähler theorem
