= Orbit (control theory) =

The notion of orbit of a control system used in mathematical control theory is a particular case of the notion of orbit in group theory.

== Definition ==
Let ${\ }\dot q=f(q,u)$ be a $\ {\mathcal C}^\infty$ control system, where ${\ q}$ belongs to a finite-dimensional manifold $\ M$ and $\ u$ belongs to a control set $\ U$. Consider the family ${\mathcal F}=\{f(\cdot,u)\mid u\in U\}$ and assume that every vector field in ${\mathcal F}$ is complete. For every $f\in {\mathcal F}$ and every real $\ t$, denote by $\ e^{t f}$ the flow of $\ f$ at time $\ t$.

The orbit of the control system ${\ }\dot q=f(q,u)$ through a point $q_0\in M$ is the subset ${\mathcal O}_{q_0}$ of $\ M$ defined by

$${\mathcal O}_{q_0}=\{e^{t_k f_k}\circ e^{t_{k-1} f_{k-1}}\circ\cdots\circ e^{t_1 f_1}(q_0)\mid k\in\mathbb{N},\ t_1,\dots,t_k\in\mathbb{R},\ f_1,\dots,f_k\in{\mathcal F}\}.$$

Remarks

The difference between orbits and attainable sets is that, whereas for attainable sets only forward-in-time motions are allowed, both forward and backward motions are permitted for orbits. In particular, if the family ${\mathcal F}$ is symmetric (i.e., $f\in {\mathcal F}$ if and only if $-f\in {\mathcal F}$), then orbits and attainable sets coincide.

The hypothesis that every vector field of ${\mathcal F}$ is complete simplifies the notations but can be dropped. In this case one has to replace flows of vector fields by local versions of them.

== Orbit theorem (Nagano–Sussmann) ==
Each orbit ${\mathcal O}_{q_0}$ is an immersed submanifold of $\ M$.

The tangent space to the orbit ${\mathcal O}_{q_0}$ at a point $\ q$ is the linear subspace of $\ T_q M$ spanned by the vectors $\ P_* f(q)$ where $\ P_* f$ denotes the pushforward of $\ f$ by $\ P$, $\ f$ belongs to ${\mathcal F}$ and $\ P$ is a diffeomorphism of $\ M$ of the form $e^{t_k f_k}\circ \cdots\circ e^{t_1 f_1}$ with $k\in\mathbb{N},\ t_1,\dots,t_k\in\mathbb{R}$ and $f_1,\dots,f_k\in{\mathcal F}$.

If all the vector fields of the family ${\mathcal F}$ are analytic, then $\ T_q{\mathcal O}_{q_0}=\mathrm{Lie}_q\,\mathcal{F}$ where $\mathrm{Lie}_q\,\mathcal{F}$ is the evaluation at $\ q$ of the Lie algebra generated by ${\mathcal F}$ with respect to the Lie bracket of vector fields. Otherwise, the inclusion $\mathrm{Lie}_q\,\mathcal{F}\subset T_q{\mathcal O}_{q_0}$ holds true.

== Corollary (Rashevsky–Chow theorem) ==
If $\mathrm{Lie}_q\,\mathcal{F}= T_q M$ for every $\ q\in M$ and if $\ M$ is connected, then each orbit is equal to the whole manifold $\ M$.

== See also ==
- Frobenius theorem (differential topology)
