= Integrability conditions for differential systems =

In mathematics, certain systems of partial differential equations are usefully formulated, from the point of view of their underlying geometric and algebraic structure, in terms of a system of differential forms. The idea is to take advantage of the way a differential form restricts to a submanifold, and the fact that this restriction is compatible with the exterior derivative. This is one possible approach to certain over-determined systems, for example, including Lax pairs of integrable systems.

== Mathematical formulation ==
A Pfaffian system is specified by 1-forms alone, but the theory includes other types of example of differential system. To elaborate, a Pfaffian system is a set of 1-forms on a smooth manifold (which one sets equal to 0 to find solutions to the system).

Given a collection of differential 1-forms $\textstyle\alpha_i, i=1,2,\dots, k$ on an $\textstyle n$-dimensional manifold $M$, an integral manifold is an immersed (not necessarily embedded) submanifold whose tangent space at every point $\textstyle p\in N$ is annihilated by (the pullback of) each $\textstyle \alpha_i$.

A maximal integral manifold is an immersed (not necessarily embedded) submanifold

$$i:N\subset M$$

such that the kernel of the restriction map on forms

$$i^*:\Omega_p^1(M)\rightarrow \Omega_p^1(N)$$

is spanned by the $\textstyle \alpha_i$ at every point $p$ of $N$. If in addition the $\textstyle \alpha_i$ are linearly independent, then $N$ is ($n-k$)-dimensional.

A Pfaffian system is said to be completely integrable if $M$ admits a foliation by maximal integral manifolds. (Note that the foliation need not be regular; i.e. the leaves of the foliation might not be embedded submanifolds.)

An integrability condition is a condition on the $\alpha_i$ to guarantee that there will be integral submanifolds of sufficiently high dimension.

=== Intuition ===
The standard contact structure on $\R^3$, defined by the 1-form $dz - ydx$. Due to the twisting, it is completely non-integrable anywhere.

A Pfaffian system is specified by 1-forms. At each point $x \in M$, the set of 1-forms can be visualized as a set of hyperplanes, or contact elements, centered on the point. The hyperplanes intersect, producing a linear subspace of the local tangent space $T_x M$. This field of linear subspaces locally look like infinitesimal pieces of a maximal integral manifold, but it might be impossible to put together these infinitesimal pieces into a maximal integral manifold. The pieces might twist against each other, breaking any attempt to piece them together.

For example, if $M$ has 3 dimensions, then a single 1-form produces a field of planes, while two 1-forms that are linearly independent at every point produces a field of lines. Integrating a field of lines is always possible, but integrating a field of planes may be impossible, due to "twisting". Locally, such non-integrable field of planes look like the standard contact structure on $\R^3$, defined by the 1-form $dz - ydx$.

== Necessary and sufficient conditions ==
The necessary and sufficient conditions for complete integrability of a Pfaffian system are given by the Frobenius theorem. One version states that if the ideal $\mathcal I$ algebraically generated by the collection of α_{i} inside the ring Ω(M) is differentially closed, in other words

$$d{\mathcal I}\subset {\mathcal I},$$

then the system admits a foliation by maximal integral manifolds. (The converse is obvious from the definitions.)

== Examples ==
=== Integrable regular systems ===
Given any regular foliation, we can simply take its differentials to obtain an integrable regular system. The rank of the system is the codimension of the foliation.

The Hopf fibration is a foliation of the 3-sphere into circles, which is a regular foliation of codimension 2.

=== Integrable singular systems ===
Similar to integrable regular systems, a singular foliation produces an integrable singular system. For example, $\R^3$ can be foliated into concentric circles with a singular point at the origin. This corresponds to an integrable singular system
$$d(x^2+y^2+z^2) = 0 \implies xdx + ydy + zdz = 0$$

=== Completely non-integrable systems ===
Not every Pfaffian system is completely integrable in the Frobenius sense. For example, consider the following one-form on R^{3} ∖ (0,0,0):

$$\theta=z\,dx +x\,dy+y\,dz.$$

If dθ were in the ideal generated by θ we would have, by the skewness of the wedge product

$$\theta\wedge d\theta=0.$$

But a direct calculation gives

$$\theta\wedge d\theta=(x+y+z)\,dx\wedge dy\wedge dz ,$$

which is a nonzero multiple of the standard volume form on R^{3}. Therefore, there are no two-dimensional leaves, and the system is not completely integrable.

On the other hand, for the curve defined by

$$x = t,  \quad y = c,  \quad z = e^{-t/c},  \qquad t > 0$$

then θ defined as above is 0, and hence the curve is easily verified to be a solution (i.e. an integral curve) for the above Pfaffian system for any nonzero constant c.

In general, a 1-form $\theta$ in a manifold of dimension $2n+1$ is completely non-integrable iff $\theta \wedge d\theta^n \neq 0$ everywhere. By a theorem of Pfaff, generalized by Darboux's theorem, there exists local coordinates in which it is of the form $dz - \sum_{i=1}^n y_i dx_i$. Such structures are contact structures.

Analogously, in an even-dimensional manifold, a 1-form $\theta$ in a manifold of dimension $2n+2$ is completely non-integrable iff $\theta \wedge d\theta^n \neq 0$ everywhere. Such structures are even-contact structures.

The 3-sphere $\mathbb{S}^3$ can be given a contact structure by considering it as the unit sphere in $\mathbb{C}^2$. The standard contact form on $\mathbb{S}^3$ is:
$$\alpha=\frac{1}{2}\left(x_1 d y_1-y_1 d x_1+x_2 d y_2-y_2 d x_2\right)$$
where $\left(x_1, y_1, x_2, y_2\right)$ are coordinates on $\mathbb{R}^4$.

=== Partially integrable system ===
Some Pfaffian systems do not have a maximal integrable foliation, but are also not completely non-integrable.

For example, the standard contact structure on $\R^3$, defined by the 1-form $dx_0 - x_2dx_1$, is completely non-integrable, in the sense that any integral manifold of it can have only 1 dimension (these are called the Legendrian submanifolds). However, if we were to extend to $\R^5$, then $dx_0 - x_2dx_1$ can have an integral manifold of 3 dimensions. This is not the lowest dimension achievable, so it is neither completely integrable nor completely non-integrable, making it partially integrable.

In $\R^5$, a completely integrable 1-form would have integral manifolds of 4 dimensions, and the standard contact structure $dx_0 - x_2dx_1 - x_4dx_3$ can only have integral manifolds of 2 dimensions, which makes it completely non-integrable.

== Applications ==
In pseudo-Riemannian geometry, we may consider the problem of finding an orthogonal coframe θ^{i}, i.e., a collection of 1-forms that form a basis of the cotangent space at every point with $\langle\theta^i,\theta^j\rangle=\delta^{ij}$ that are closed (dθ^{i} = 0, i = 1, 2, ..., n). By the Poincaré lemma, the θ^{i} locally will have the form dx^{i} for some functions x^{i} on the manifold, and thus provide an isometry of an open subset of M with an open subset of R^{n}. Such a manifold is called locally flat.

This problem reduces to a question on the coframe bundle of M. Suppose we had such a closed coframe

$$\Theta=(\theta^1,\dots,\theta^n).$$

If we had another coframe $\Phi=(\phi^1,\dots,\phi^n)$, then the two coframes would be related by an orthogonal transformation

$$\Phi=M\Theta$$

If the connection 1-form is ω, then we have

$$d\Phi=\omega\wedge\Phi$$

On the other hand,

$$\begin{align}
d\Phi & = (dM)\wedge\Theta+M\wedge d\Theta \\
& =(dM)\wedge\Theta \\
& =(dM)M^{-1}\wedge\Phi.
\end{align}$$

But $\omega=(dM)M^{-1}$ is the Maurer–Cartan form for the orthogonal group. Therefore, it obeys the structural equation $d\omega+\omega\wedge\omega=0$, and this is just the curvature of M: $\Omega=d\omega+\omega\wedge\omega=0.$ After an application of the Frobenius theorem, one concludes that a manifold M is locally flat if and only if its curvature vanishes.

== Generalizations ==
Many generalizations exist to integrability conditions on differential systems that are not necessarily generated by one-forms. The most famous of these are the Cartan–Kähler theorem, which only works for real analytic differential systems, and the Cartan–Kuranishi prolongation theorem. See § Further reading for details. The Newlander–Nirenberg theorem gives integrability conditions for an almost-complex structure.
