= H-derivative =

In mathematics, the H-derivative is a notion of derivative in the study of abstract Wiener spaces and the Malliavin calculus.

== Definition ==
Let $i : H \to E$ be an abstract Wiener space, and suppose that $F : E \to \mathbb{R}$ is differentiable. Then the Fréchet derivative is a map

$$\mathrm{D} F : E \to \mathrm{Lin} (E; \mathbb{R})$$;

i.e., for $x \in E$, $\mathrm{D} F (x)$ is an element of $E^{*}$, the dual space to $E$.

Therefore, define the $H$-derivative $\mathrm{D}_{H} F$ at $x \in E$ by

$$\mathrm{D}_{H} F (x) := \mathrm{D} F (x) \circ i : H \to \R$$,

a continuous linear map on $H$.

Define the $H$-gradient $\nabla_{H} F : E \to H$ by

$$\langle \nabla_{H} F (x), h \rangle_{H} = \left( \mathrm{D}_{H} F \right) (x) (h) = \lim_{t \to 0} \frac{F (x + t i(h)) - F(x)}{t}$$.

That is, if $j : E^{*} \to H$ denotes the adjoint of $i : H \to E$, we have $\nabla_{H} F (x) := j \left( \mathrm{D} F (x) \right)$.

== See also ==
- Malliavin derivative
