= Grassmann bundle =

In algebraic geometry, the Grassmann d-plane bundle of a vector bundle E on an algebraic scheme X is a scheme over X:

$$p: G_d(E) \to X$$

such that the fiber $p^{-1}(x) = G_d(E_x)$ is the Grassmannian of the d-dimensional vector subspaces of $E_x$. For example, $G_1(E) = \mathbb{P}(E)$ is the projective bundle of E. In the other direction, a Grassmann bundle is a special case of a (partial) flag bundle. Concretely, the Grassmann bundle can be constructed as a Quot scheme.

The Grassmann bundle of the tangent bundle is the contact bundle.

Like the usual Grassmannian, the Grassmann bundle comes with natural vector bundles on it; namely, there are universal or tautological subbundle S and universal quotient bundle Q that fit into

$$0 \to S \to p^*E \to Q \to 0$$.

Specifically, if V is in the fiber p^{−1}(x), then the fiber of S over V is V itself; thus, S has rank r = d = dim(V) and $\wedge^d S$ is the determinant line bundle. Now, by the universal property of a projective bundle, the injection $\wedge^r S \to p^* (\wedge^r E)$ corresponds to the morphism over X:

$$G_d(E) \to \mathbb{P}(\wedge^r E)$$,

which is nothing but a family of Plücker embeddings.

The relative tangent bundle T_{G_{d}(E)/X} of G_{d}(E) is given by

$$T_{G_d(E)/X} = \operatorname{Hom}(S, Q) = S^{\vee} \otimes Q,$$

which morally is given by the second fundamental form. In the case d = 1, it is given as follows: if V is a finite-dimensional vector space, then for each line $l$ in V passing through the origin (a point of $\mathbb{P}(V)$), there is the natural identification (see Chern class#Complex projective space for example):

$$\operatorname{Hom}(l, V/l) = T_l \mathbb{P}(V)$$

and the above is the family-version of this identification. (The general care is a generalization of this.)

In the case d = 1, the early exact sequence tensored with the dual of S = O(-1) gives:

$$0 \to \mathcal{O}_{\mathbb{P}(E)} \to p^* E \otimes \mathcal{O}_{\mathbb{P}(E)}(1) \to T_{\mathbb{P}(E)/X} \to 0$$,

which is the relative version of the Euler sequence.
