= Marie-Paule Malliavin =

French mathematician (1935–2019)

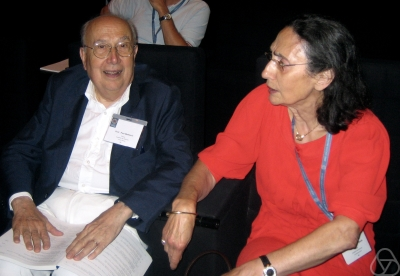
- Marie-Paule Malliavin with her husband Paul Malliavin at the ICM in Madrid, 2006
- Spouse: Paul Malliavin (m. 1965)

Academic work
- Discipline: Mathematics
- Sub-discipline: Abstract algebra
- Institutions: University of Caen; Pierre and Marie Curie University

Marie-Paule Malliavin, née Brameret, (1935 in Mahdia – 25 September 2019 in Paris) was a French mathematician who specialised in the field of algebra.

== Family ==
She was married to the mathematician Paul Malliavin since 27 April 1965. They had two children (Thérèse and Marie-Joseph).

== Career ==
She published her first mathematical article in 1960 and received her doctorate in 1965.

After her doctorate, she first became maître de conférences at the University of Caen. Later she became a professor at the Pierre and Marie Curie University (UPMC, Paris 6) in Paris, where she remained until her retirement.

Her mathematical students include Jacques Alev and Youssef El From. She wrote several textbooks; the books on commutative algebra and representation theory of finite groups are frequently cited.

At the beginning of her career, she worked on commutative algebra, later on non-commutative algebra. This was at a time when enveloping algebras and then quantum groups were evolving. She collaborated with her husband Paul Malliavin in particular in the study of measures on infinite-dimensional groups.

Marie-Paule Malliavin was editor of top-ranked international research journals. She also organised the Algebra Seminar at the Institut Henri Poincaré for several decades, succeeding the deceased Professor Paul Dubreil.
