= Hörmander's condition =

Property of vector fields in mathematics

In mathematics, Hörmander's condition is a property of vector fields that, if satisfied, has many useful consequences in the theory of partial and stochastic differential equations. The condition is named after the Swedish mathematician Lars Hörmander.

== Definition ==
Given two C^{1} vector fields V and W on d-dimensional Euclidean space R^{d}, let [V, W] denote their Lie bracket, another vector field defined by

$$[V, W] (x) = \mathrm{D} V(x) W(x) - \mathrm{D} W(x) V(x),$$

where DV(x) denotes the Fréchet derivative of V at x ∈ R^{d}, which can be thought of as a matrix that is applied to the vector W(x), and vice versa.

Let A_{0}, A_{1}, ... A_{n} be vector fields on R^{d}. They are said to satisfy Hörmander's condition if, for every point x ∈ R^{d}, the vectors

$$\begin{align}
&A_{j_0} (x)~,\\
&[A_{j_{0}} (x), A_{j_{1}} (x)]~,\\
&[[A_{j_{0}} (x), A_{j_{1}} (x)], A_{j_{2}} (x)]~,\\
&\quad\vdots\quad
\end{align}
\qquad 0 \leq j_{0}, j_{1}, \ldots, j_{n} \leq n$$

span R^{d}. They are said to satisfy the parabolic Hörmander condition if the same holds true, but with the index $j_0$ taking only values in 1,...,n.

== Application to stochastic differential equations ==
Consider the stochastic differential equation (SDE)

$$\operatorname dx = A_0(x) \operatorname dt + \sum_{i=1}^n A_i(x) \circ \operatorname dW_i$$

where the vectors fields $A_0,\dotsc,A_n$ are assumed to have bounded derivative, $(W_1,\dotsc,W_n)$ the normalized n-dimensional Brownian motion and $\circ\operatorname d$ stands for the Stratonovich integral interpretation of the SDE. Hörmander's theorem asserts that if the SDE above satisfies the parabolic Hörmander condition, then its solutions admit a smooth density with respect to Lebesgue measure.

== Application to the Cauchy problem ==
With the same notation as above, define a second-order differential operator F by

$$F = \frac1{2} \sum_{i = 1}^n A_i^2 + A_0.$$

An important problem in the theory of partial differential equations is to determine sufficient conditions on the vector fields A_{i} for the Cauchy problem

$$\begin{cases} \dfrac{\partial u}{\partial t} (t, x) = F u(t, x), & t > 0, x \in \mathbf{R}^{d}; \\ u(t, \cdot) \to f, & \text{as } t \to 0; \end{cases}$$

to have a smooth fundamental solution, i.e. a real-valued function p (0, +∞) × R^{2d} → R such that p(t, ·, ·) is smooth on R^{2d} for each t and

$$u(t, x) = \int_{\mathbf{R}^{d}} p(t, x, y) f(y) \, \mathrm{d} y$$

satisfies the Cauchy problem above. It had been known for some time that a smooth solution exists in the elliptic case, in which

$$A_{i} = \sum_{j = 1}^{d} a_{ji} \frac{\partial}{\partial x_{j}},$$

and the matrix A = (a_{ji}), 1 ≤ j ≤ d, 1 ≤ i ≤ n is such that AA^{∗} is everywhere an invertible matrix.

The great achievement of Hörmander's 1967 paper was to show that a smooth fundamental solution exists under a considerably weaker assumption: the parabolic version of the condition that now bears his name.

== Application to control systems ==
Let M be a smooth manifold and $A_0,\dotsc,A_n$ be smooth vector fields on M. Assuming that these vector fields satisfy Hörmander's condition, then the control system

$$\dot{x} = \sum_{i=0}^{n} u_{i} A_{i}(x)$$

is locally controllable in any time at every point of M. This is known as the Chow–Rashevskii theorem. See Orbit (control theory).

== See also ==
- Malliavin calculus
- Lie algebra
