= Chow–Rashevsky theorem =

On horizontal paths in a sub-Riemannian manifold

In sub-Riemannian geometry, the Chow–Rashevsky theorem (also known as Chow's theorem) asserts that any two points of a connected sub-Riemannian manifold, endowed with a bracket generating distribution, are connected by a horizontal path in the manifold. It is named after Wei-Liang Chow who proved it in 1939, and Pyotr Rashevsky, who proved it independently in 1938.

The theorem has a number of equivalent statements, one of which is that the topology induced by the Carnot–Carathéodory metric is equivalent to the intrinsic (locally Euclidean) topology of the manifold. A stronger statement that implies the theorem is the ball–box theorem. See, for instance, Montgomery (2006) and Gromov (1996).

== See also ==
- Orbit (control theory)
