= Subbundle =

Mathematical collection

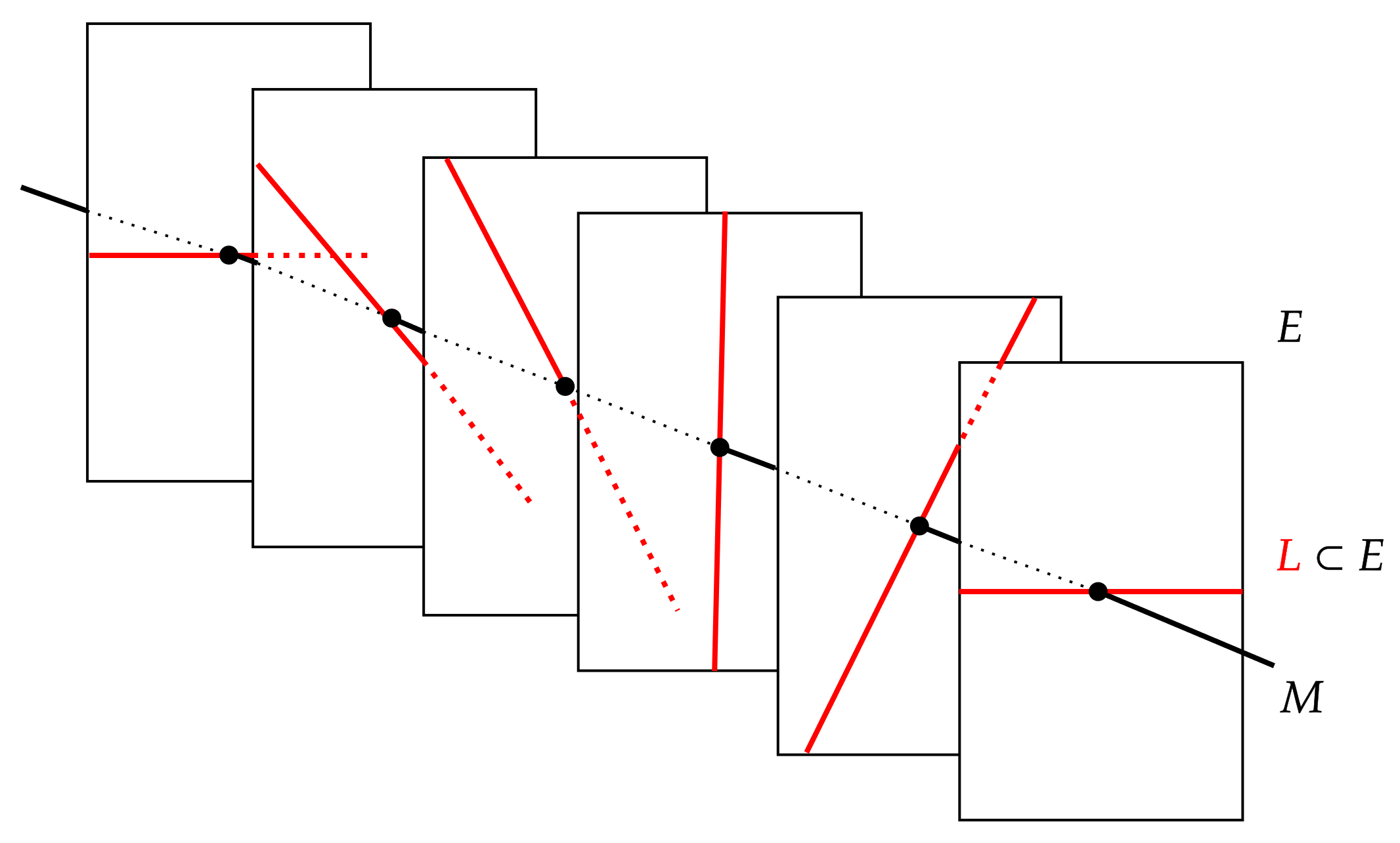
A subbundle $L$ of a vector bundle $E$ over a topological space $M$.

In mathematics, a subbundle $L$ of a vector bundle $E$ over a topological space $M$ is a subset of $E$ such that for each $x$ in $M,$ the set $L_x$, the intersection of the fiber $E_x$ with $L$, is a vector subspace of the fiber $E_x$ so that $L$ is a vector bundle over $M$ in its own right.

In connection with foliation theory, a subbundle of the tangent bundle of a smooth manifold may be called a distribution (of tangent vectors).

If locally, in a neighborhood $N_x$ of $x \in M$, a set of vector fields $Y_k$ span the vector spaces $L_y, y \in N_x,$ and all Lie commutators $\left[Y_i, Y_j\right]$ are linear combinations of $Y_1, \dots, Y_n$ then one says that $L$ is an involutive distribution.

== See also ==
- Frobenius theorem (differential topology) – On finding a maximal set of solutions of a system of first-order homogeneous linear PDEs
- Sub-Riemannian manifold – Type of generalization of a Riemannian manifold
