= Chow's moving lemma =

Theorem in algebraic geometry

In algebraic geometry, Chow's moving lemma, proved by Wei-Liang Chow (1956), states: given algebraic cycles Y, Z on a nonsingular quasi-projective variety X, there is another algebraic cycle Z' which is rationally equivalent to Z on X, such that Y and Z' intersect properly. The lemma is one of the key ingredients in developing intersection theory and the Chow ring, as it is used to show the uniqueness of the theory.

Even if Z is an effective cycle, it is not, in general, possible to choose Z' to be effective.
