= Ana Bela Cruzeiro =

Portuguese mathematician

Ana Bela Cruzeiro (born 1957) is a Portuguese and Swiss mathematician whose research concerns stochastic analysis and the Malliavin calculus, as well as the differential equations used to model fluid dynamics and quantum mechanics. She is a professor of mathematics at the Instituto Superior Técnico, part of the University of Lisbon.

== Education and career ==
After earning a master's degree in mathematics at the University of Lisbon in 1980, Cruzeiro studied mathematics at Pierre and Marie Curie University in Paris, earning a diplôme d'études approfondies in 1982, a doctorat de troisième cycle in 1983, and a doctorat d'état in 1985. Her 1985 doctoral dissertation, Equations différentielles ordinaires et équations différentielles stochastiques sur l'espace de Wiener, was supervised by Paul Malliavin. She also earned a habilitation (agregação) at the University of Lisbon in 1991.

She has been on the faculty of the University of Lisbon since 1986, and became a full professor in Instituto Superior Técnico in 2002.

== Recognition ==
Cruzeiro is a corresponding member of the Lisbon Academy of Sciences, elected in 2020.
