= Wei-Liang Chow =

Chinese mathematician

- Chinese: 周煒良
- Born: October 1, 1911; Shanghai, China
- Died: August 10, 1995 (aged 83); Baltimore, Maryland, U.S.
- Other name: Zhou Wei-Liang
- Education: Leipzig University; University of Chicago
- Known for: Chow group; Chow's lemma; Chow's moving lemma; Chow's theorem; Chow–Rashevskii theorem
- Scientific career
- Fields: Mathematics
- Workplaces: Johns Hopkins University; Institute for Advanced Study; National Tung-Chi University
- Thesis: Die geometrische Theorie der algebraischen Funktionen für beliebige vollkommene Körper (1936)
- Doctoral advisor: Bartel Leendert van der Waerden; Paul Koebe

Chow Wei-Liang (simplified Chinese: 周炜良; traditional Chinese: 周煒良; pinyin: Zhōu Wěiliáng; Wade–Giles: Chou Weiliang; October 1, 1911, Shanghai – August 10, 1995, Baltimore) was a Chinese-American mathematician and stamp collector. He was well known for his work in algebraic geometry.

== Biography ==
Chow was a student in the US, graduating from the University of Chicago in 1931. In 1932 he attended the University of Göttingen, then transferred to the Leipzig University where he worked with Van der Waerden. They produced a series of joint papers on intersection theory, introducing in particular the use of what are now generally called Chow coordinates (which were in some form familiar to Arthur Cayley).

He married Margot Victor in 1936, and took a position at the National Central University in Nanjing. His mathematical work was seriously affected by the wartime situation in China. He taught at the National Tung-Chi University in Shanghai in the academic year 1946–47, and then went to the Institute for Advanced Study in Princeton, where he returned to his research. From 1948 to 1977 he was a professor at Johns Hopkins University.

He was also a stamp collector, known for his book Shanghai Large Dragons, The First Issue of The Shanghai Local Post, published in 1996.

== Research ==
According to the Chinese-American mathematician and Wolf Prize laureate Shiing-Shen Chern,

"Wei-Liang was an original and versatile mathematician, although his major field was algebraic geometry. He made several fundamental contributions to mathematics:

1. A fundamental issue in algebraic geometry is intersection theory. The Chow ring has many advantages and is widely used.
2. The Chow associated forms give a description of the moduli space of the algebraic varieties in projective space. It gives a beautiful solution of an important problem.
3. His theorem that a compact analytic variety in a projective space is algebraic is justly famous. The theorem shows the close analogy between algebraic geometry and algebraic number theory.
4. Generalizing a result of Caratheodory on thermodynamics, he formulated a theorem on accessibility of differential spaces. The theorem plays a fundamental role in control theory.
5. A lesser-known paper of his on homogeneous spaces gives a beautiful treatment of the geometry known as the projective geometry of matrices and treated by elaborate calculations. His discussions are valid in a more general context."

== See also ==
- Chow's lemma
- Chow's moving lemma
- Chow's theorem
- Chow ring
- Chow–Rashevskii theorem
