= Chow's lemma =

Chow's lemma, named after Wei-Liang Chow, is one of the foundational results in algebraic geometry. It roughly says that a proper morphism is fairly close to being a projective morphism. More precisely, a version of it states the following:

If $X$ is a scheme that is proper over a noetherian base $S$, then there exists a projective $S$-scheme $X'$ and a surjective $S$-morphism $f: X' \to X$ that induces an isomorphism $f^{-1}(U) \simeq U$ for some dense open $U\subseteq X.$

== Proof ==
The proof here is a standard one.

=== Reduction to the case of $X$ irreducible ===
We can first reduce to the case where $X$ is irreducible. To start, $X$ is noetherian since it is of finite type over a noetherian base. Therefore it has finitely many irreducible components $X_i$, and we claim that for each $X_i$ there is an irreducible proper $S$-scheme $Y_i$ so that $Y_i\to X$ has set-theoretic image $X_i$ and is an isomorphism on the open dense subset $X_i\setminus \cup_{j\neq i} X_j$ of $X_i$. To see this, define $Y_i$ to be the scheme-theoretic image of the open immersion

$$X\setminus \cup_{j\neq i} X_j \to X.$$

Since $X\setminus \cup_{j\neq i} X_j$ is set-theoretically noetherian for each $i$, the map $X\setminus \cup_{j\neq i} X_j\to X$ is quasi-compact and we may compute this scheme-theoretic image affine-locally on $X$, immediately proving the two claims. If we can produce for each $Y_i$ a projective $S$-scheme $Y_i'$ as in the statement of the theorem, then we can take $X'$ to be the disjoint union $\coprod Y_i'$ and $f$ to be the composition $\coprod Y_i' \to \coprod Y_i\to X$: this map is projective, and an isomorphism over a dense open set of $X$, while $\coprod Y_i'$ is a projective $S$-scheme since it is a finite union of projective $S$-schemes. Since each $Y_i$ is proper over $S$, we've completed the reduction to the case $X$ irreducible.

=== $X$ can be covered by finitely many quasi-projective $S$-schemes ===
Next, we will show that $X$ can be covered by a finite number of open subsets $U_i$ so that each $U_i$ is quasi-projective over $S$. To do this, we may by quasi-compactness first cover $S$ by finitely many affine opens $S_j$, and then cover the preimage of each $S_j$ in $X$ by finitely many affine opens $X_{jk}$ each with a closed immersion in to $\mathbb{A}^n_{S_j}$ since $X\to S$ is of finite type and therefore quasi-compact. Composing this map with the open immersions $\mathbb{A}^n_{S_j}\to \mathbb{P}^n_{S_j}$ and $\mathbb{P}^n_{S_j} \to \mathbb{P}^n_S$, we see that each $X_{ij}$ is a closed subscheme of an open subscheme of $\mathbb{P}^n_S$. As $\mathbb{P}^n_S$ is noetherian, every closed subscheme of an open subscheme is also an open subscheme of a closed subscheme, and therefore each $X_{ij}$ is quasi-projective over $S$.

=== Construction of $X'$ and $f:X'\to X$ ===
Now suppose $\{U_i\}$ is a finite open cover of $X$ by quasi-projective $S$-schemes, with $\phi_i:U_i\to P_i$ an open immersion in to a projective $S$-scheme. Set $U=\cap_i U_i$, which is nonempty as $X$ is irreducible. The restrictions of the $\phi_i$ to $U$ define a morphism

$$\phi: U \to P = P_1 \times_S \cdots \times_S P_n$$

so that $U\to U_i\to P_i = U\stackrel{\phi}{\to} P \stackrel{p_i}{\to} P_i$, where $U\to U_i$ is the canonical injection and $p_i:P\to P_i$ is the projection. Letting $j:U\to X$ denote the canonical open immersion, we define $\psi=(j,\phi)_S: U\to X\times_S P$, which we claim is an immersion. To see this, note that this morphism can be factored as the graph morphism $U\to U\times_S P$ (which is a closed immersion as $P\to S$ is separated) followed by the open immersion $U\times_S P\to X\times_S P$; as $X\times_S P$ is noetherian, we can apply the same logic as before to see that we can swap the order of the open and closed immersions.

Now let $X'$ be the scheme-theoretic image of $\psi$, and factor $\psi$ as

$$\psi:U\stackrel{\psi'}{\to} X'\stackrel{h}{\to} X\times_S P$$

where $\psi'$ is an open immersion and $h$ is a closed immersion. Let $q_1:X\times_S P\to X$ and $q_2:X\times_S P\to P$ be the canonical projections. Set

$$f:X'\stackrel{h}{\to} X\times_S P \stackrel{q_1}{\to} X,$$
$$g:X'\stackrel{h}{\to} X\times_S P \stackrel{q_2}{\to} P.$$

We will show that $X'$ and $f$ satisfy the conclusion of the theorem.

=== Verification of the claimed properties of $X'$ and $f$ ===
To show $f$ is surjective, we first note that it is proper and therefore closed. As its image contains the dense open set $U\subset X$, we see that $f$ must be surjective. It is also straightforward to see that $f$ induces an isomorphism on $U$: we may just combine the facts that $f^{-1}(U)=h^{-1}(U\times_S P)$ and $\psi$ is an isomorphism on to its image, as $\psi$ factors as the composition of a closed immersion followed by an open immersion $U\to U\times_S P \to X\times_S P$. It remains to show that $X'$ is projective over $S$.

We will do this by showing that $g:X'\to P$ is an immersion. We define the following four families of open subschemes:

$$V_i = \phi_i(U_i)\subset P_i$$
$$W_i = p_i^{-1}(V_i)\subset P$$
$$U_i' = f^{-1}(U_i)\subset X'$$
$$U_i'' = g^{-1}(W_i)\subset X'.$$

As the $U_i$ cover $X$, the $U_i'$ cover $X'$, and we wish to show that the $U_i''$ also cover $X'$. We will do this by showing that $U_i'\subset U_i''$ for all $i$. It suffices to show that $p_i\circ g|_{U_i'}:U_i'\to P_i$ is equal to $\phi_i\circ f|_{U_i'}:U_i'\to P_i$ as a map of topological spaces. Replacing $U_i'$ by its reduction, which has the same underlying topological space, we have that the two morphisms $(U_i')_{red}\to P_i$ are both extensions of the underlying map of topological space $U\to U_i\to P_i$, so by the reduced-to-separated lemma they must be equal as $U$ is topologically dense in $U_i$. Therefore $U_i'\subset U_i''$ for all $i$ and the claim is proven.

The upshot is that the $W_i$ cover $g(X')$, and we can check that $g$ is an immersion by checking that $g|_{U_i''}:U_i''\to W_i$ is an immersion for all $i$. For this, consider the morphism

$$u_i:W_i\stackrel{p_i}{\to} V_i\stackrel{\phi_i^{-1}}{\to} U_i\to X.$$

Since $X\to S$ is separated, the graph morphism $\Gamma_{u_i}:W_i\to X\times_S W_i$ is a closed immersion and the graph $T_i=\Gamma_{u_i}(W_i)$ is a closed subscheme of $X\times_S W_i$; if we show that $U\to X\times_S W_i$ factors through this graph (where we consider $U\subset X'$ via our observation that $f$ is an isomorphism over $f^{-1}(U)$ from earlier), then the map from $U_i''$ must also factor through this graph by construction of the scheme-theoretic image. Since the restriction of $q_2$ to $T_i$ is an isomorphism onto $W_i$, the restriction of $g$ to $U_i''$ will be an immersion into $W_i$, and our claim will be proven. Let $v_i$ be the canonical injection $U\subset X' \to X\times_S W_i$; we have to show that there is a morphism $w_i:U\subset X'\to W_i$ so that $v_i=\Gamma_{u_i}\circ w_i$. By the definition of the fiber product, it suffices to prove that $q_1\circ v_i= u_i\circ q_2\circ v_i$, or by identifying $U\subset X$ and $U\subset X'$, that $q_1\circ\psi=u_i\circ q_2\circ \psi$. But $q_1\circ\psi = j$ and $q_2\circ\psi=\phi$, so the desired conclusion follows from the definition of $\phi:U\to P$ and $g$ is an immersion. Since $X'\to S$ is proper, any $S$-morphism out of $X'$ is closed, and thus $g:X'\to P$ is a closed immersion, so $X'$ is projective. $\blacksquare$

== Additional statements ==
In the statement of Chow's lemma, if $X$ is reduced, irreducible, or integral, we can assume that the same holds for $X'$. If both $X$ and $X'$ are irreducible, then $f: X' \to X$ is a birational morphism.

== Bibliography ==
- Grothendieck, Alexandre; Dieudonné, Jean (1961). "Éléments de géométrie algébrique: II. Étude globale élémentaire de quelques classes de morphismes". Publications Mathématiques de l'IHÉS. 8. doi:10.1007/bf02699291. MR 0217084.
- Hartshorne, Robin (1977), Algebraic Geometry, Graduate Texts in Mathematics, vol. 52, New York: Springer-Verlag, ISBN 978-0-387-90244-9, MR 0463157
