= Differential ideal =

In the theory of differential forms, a differential ideal I is an algebraic ideal in the ring of smooth differential forms on a smooth manifold, in other words a graded ideal in the sense of ring theory, that is further closed under exterior differentiation d, meaning that for any form α in I, the exterior derivative dα is also in I.

In the theory of differential algebra, a differential ideal I in a differential ring R is an ideal which is mapped to itself by each differential operator.

== Exterior differential systems and partial differential equations ==
An exterior differential system consists of a smooth manifold $M$ and a differential ideal

$$I\subset \Omega^*(M)$$.

An integral manifold of an exterior differential system $(M,I)$ consists of a submanifold $N\subset M$ having the property that the pullback to $N$ of all differential forms contained in $I$ vanishes identically.

One can express any partial differential equation system as an exterior differential system with independence condition. Suppose that we have a kth order partial differential equation system for maps $u: \mathbb{R}^m \rightarrow \mathbb{R}^n$, given by

$$F^r\left(x, u, \frac{\partial^{|I|}u }{\partial x^I}\right)=0, \quad 1\le |I|\le k$$.

The graph of the $k$-jet $(u^a,p^a_i,\dots,p^a_I)=(u^a(x),\frac{\partial u^a}{\partial x^i},\dots,\frac{\partial^{|I|}u }{\partial x^I})_{1\le |I|\le k}$ of any solution of this partial differential equation system is a submanifold $N$ of the jet space, and is an integral manifold of the contact system $du^a-p^a_i dx^i,\dots,dp^a_I-p^p_{Ij} dx^j{}_{1\le |I|\le k-1}$on the $k$-jet bundle.

This idea allows one to analyze the properties of partial differential equations with methods of differential geometry. For instance, we can apply the Cartan–Kähler theorem to a system of partial differential equations by writing down the associated exterior differential system. We can frequently apply Cartan's equivalence method to exterior differential systems to study their symmetries and their diffeomorphism invariants.

== Perfect differential ideals ==
A differential ideal $I \,$ is perfect if it has the property that if it contains an element $a \in I$ then it contains any element $b \in I$ such that $b^n = a$ for some $n > 0 \,$. In other words, perfect differential ideals are radical differential ideals.
