= Cartan–Kähler theorem =

In mathematics, the Cartan–Kähler theorem is a major result on the integrability conditions for differential systems, in the case of analytic functions, for differential ideals $I$. It is named for Élie Cartan and Erich Kähler.

== Meaning ==
It is not true that merely having $dI$ contained in $I$ is sufficient for integrability. There is a problem caused by singular solutions. The theorem computes certain constants that must satisfy an inequality in order that there be a solution.

== Statement ==
Let $(M,I)$ be a real analytic EDS. Assume that $P \subseteq M$ is a connected, $k$-dimensional, real analytic, regular integral manifold of $I$ with $r(P) \geq 0$ (i.e., the tangent spaces $T_p P$ are "extendable" to higher dimensional integral elements).

Moreover, assume there is a real analytic submanifold $R \subseteq M$ of codimension $r(P)$ containing $P$ and such that $T_pR \cap H(T_pP)$ has dimension $k+1$ for all $p \in P$.

Then there exists a (locally) unique connected, $(k+1)$-dimensional, real analytic integral manifold $X \subseteq M$ of $I$ that satisfies $P \subseteq X \subseteq R$.

== Proof and assumptions ==
The Cauchy-Kovalevskaya theorem is used in the proof, so the analyticity is necessary.
