= Vector flow =

Concepts in mathematics

In mathematics, the vector flow refers to a set of closely related concepts of the flow determined by a vector field. These appear in a number of different contexts, including differential topology, Riemannian geometry and Lie group theory.

== In differential topology ==
Let V be a smooth vector field on a smooth manifold M. There is a unique maximal flow D → M whose infinitesimal generator is V. Here D ⊆ R × M is the flow domain. For each p ∈ M the map D_{p} → M is the unique maximal integral curve of V starting at p.

A global flow is one whose flow domain is all of R × M. Global flows define smooth actions of R on M. A vector field is complete if it generates a global flow. Every smooth vector field on a compact manifold without boundary is complete.

== In Riemannian geometry ==
In Riemannian geometry, a vector flow can be thought of as a solution to the system of differential equations induced by a vector field. That is, if a (conservative) vector field is a map to the tangent space, it represents the tangent vectors to some function at each point. Splitting the tangent vectors into directional derivatives, one can solve the resulting system of differential equations to find the function. In this sense, the function is the flow and both induces and is induced by the vector field.

From a point, the rate of change of the i-th component with respect to the parametrization of the flow (“how much the flow has acted”) is described by the i-th component of the field. That is, if one parametrizes with L ‘length along the path of the flow,’ as one proceeds along the flow by dL the first position component changes as described by the first component of the vector field at the point one starts from, and likewise for all other components.

The exponential map

exp : T_{p}M → M

is defined as exp(X) = γ(1) where γ : I → M is the unique geodesic passing through p at 0 and whose tangent vector at 0 is X. Here I is the maximal open interval of R for which the geodesic is defined.

Let M be a pseudo-Riemannian manifold (or any manifold with an affine connection) and let p be a point in M. Then for every V in T_{p}M there exists a unique geodesic γ : I → M for which γ(0) = p and $\dot\gamma(0) = V.$ Let D_{p} be the subset of T_{p}M for which 1 lies in I.

== In Lie group theory ==
Every left-invariant vector field on a Lie group is complete. The integral curve starting at the identity is a one-parameter subgroup of G. There are one-to-one correspondences

{one-parameter subgroups of G} ⇔ {left-invariant vector fields on G} ⇔ g = T_{e}G.

Let G be a Lie group and g its Lie algebra. The exponential map is a map exp : g → G given by exp(X) = γ(1) where γ is the integral curve starting at the identity in G generated by X.

- The exponential map is smooth.
- For a fixed X, the map t ↦ exp(tX) is the one-parameter subgroup of G generated by X.
- The exponential map restricts to a diffeomorphism from some neighborhood of 0 in g to a neighborhood of e in G.
- The image of the exponential map always lies in the connected component of the identity in G.

== See also ==
- Gradient vector flow – Computer vision framework
