= Projective bundle =

Fiber bundle whose fibers are projective spaces

In mathematics, a projective bundle is a fiber bundle whose fibers are projective spaces.

By definition, a scheme X over a Noetherian scheme S is a P^{n}-bundle if it is locally a projective n-space; i.e., $X \times_S U \simeq \mathbb{P}^n_U$ and transition automorphisms are linear. Over a regular scheme S such as a smooth variety, every projective bundle is of the form $\mathbb{P}(E)$ for some vector bundle (locally free sheaf) E.

== The projective bundle of a vector bundle ==
Every vector bundle over a variety X gives a projective bundle by taking the projective spaces of the fibers, but not all projective bundles arise in this way: there is an obstruction in the cohomology group H^{2}(X,O*). To see why, recall that a projective bundle comes equipped with transition functions on double intersections of a suitable open cover. On triple overlaps, any lift of these transition functions satisfies the cocycle condition up to an invertible function. The collection of these functions forms a 2-cocycle which vanishes in H^{2}(X,O*) only if the projective bundle is the projectivization of a vector bundle. In particular, if X is a compact Riemann surface then H^{2}(X,O*)=0, and so this obstruction vanishes.

The projective bundle of a vector bundle E is the same thing as the Grassmann bundle $G_1(E)$ of 1-planes in E.

The projective bundle P(E) of a vector bundle E is characterized by the universal property that says:

Given a morphism f: T → X, to factorize f through the projection map p: P(E) → X is to specify a line subbundle of f^{*}E.

For example, taking f to be p, one gets the line subbundle O(-1) of p^{*}E, called the tautological line bundle on P(E). Moreover, this O(-1) is a universal bundle in the sense that when a line bundle L gives a factorization f = p ∘ g, L is the pullback of O(-1) along g. See also Cone#O(1) for a more explicit construction of O(-1).

On P(E), there is a natural exact sequence (called the tautological exact sequence):

$$0 \to \mathcal{O}_{\mathbf{P}(E)}(-1) \to p^* E \to Q \to 0$$

where Q is called the tautological quotient-bundle.

Let E ⊂ F be vector bundles (locally free sheaves of finite rank) on X and G = F/E. Let q: P(F) → X be the projection. Then the natural map O(-1) → q^{*}F → q^{*}G is a global section of the sheaf hom Hom(O(-1), q^{*}G) = q^{*} G ⊗ O(1). Moreover, this natural map vanishes at a point exactly when the point is a line in E; in other words, the zero-locus of this section is P(E).

A particularly useful instance of this construction is when F is the direct sum E ⊕ 1 of E and the trivial line bundle (i.e., the structure sheaf). Then P(E) is a hyperplane in P(E ⊕ 1), called the hyperplane at infinity, and the complement of P(E) can be identified with E. In this way, P(E ⊕ 1) is referred to as the projective completion (or "compactification") of E.

The projective bundle P(E) is stable under twisting E by a line bundle; precisely, given a line bundle L, there is the natural isomorphism:

$$g: \mathbf{P}(E) \overset{\sim}\to \mathbf{P}(E \otimes L)$$

such that $g^*(\mathcal{O}(-1)) \simeq \mathcal{O}(-1) \otimes p^* L.$ (In fact, one gets g by the universal property applied to the line bundle on the right.)

== Examples ==
Many non-trivial examples of projective bundles can be found using fibrations over $\mathbb{P}^1$ such as Lefschetz fibrations. For example, an elliptic K3 surface $X$ is a K3 surface with a fibration

$\pi:X \to \mathbb{P}^1$

such that the fibers $E_p$ for $p \in \mathbb{P}^1$ are generically elliptic curves. Because every elliptic curve is a genus 1 curve with a distinguished point, there exists a global section of the fibration. Because of this global section, there exists a model of $X$ giving a morphism to the projective bundle

$X \to \mathbb{P}(\mathcal{O}_{\mathbb{P}^1}(4)\oplus\mathcal{O}_{\mathbb{P}^1}(6)\oplus\mathcal{O}_{\mathbb{P}^1})$

defined by the Weierstrass equation

$y^2z + a_1xyz + a_3yz^2 = x^3 + a_2x^2z + a_4xz^2 + a_6z^3$

where $x,y,z$ represent the local coordinates of $\mathcal{O}_{\mathbb{P}^1}(4), \mathcal{O}_{\mathbb{P}^1}(6), \mathcal{O}_{\mathbb{P}^1}$, respectively, and the coefficients

$a_i \in H^0(\mathbb{P}^1,\mathcal{O}_{\mathbb{P}^1}(2i))$

are sections of sheaves on $\mathbb{P}^1$. Note this equation is well-defined because each term in the Weierstrass equation has total degree $12$ (meaning the degree of the coefficient plus the degree of the monomial. For example, $\text{deg}(a_1xyz) = 2 + (4 + 6 + 0) = 12$).

The contact bundles, and more generally Grassmann bundles, are projective bundles. The unit tangent bundle of a Riemannian manifold is a double cover of its projectivized tangent bundle.

== Cohomology ring and Chow group ==
Let X be a complex smooth projective variety and E a complex vector bundle of rank r on it. Let p: P(E) → X be the projective bundle of E. Then the cohomology ring H^{*}(P(E)) is an algebra over H^{*}(X) through the pullback p^{*}. Then the first Chern class ζ = c_{1}(O(1)) generates H^{*}(P(E)) with the relation

$$\zeta^r + c_1(E) \zeta^{r-1} + \cdots + c_r(E) = 0$$

where c_{i}(E) is the i-th Chern class of E. One interesting feature of this description is that one can define Chern classes as the coefficients in the relation; this is the approach taken by Grothendieck.

Over fields other than the complex field, the same description remains true with Chow ring in place of cohomology ring (still assuming X is smooth). In particular, for Chow groups, there is the direct sum decomposition

$$A_k(\mathbf{P}(E)) = \bigoplus_{i=0}^{r-1} \zeta^i A_{k-r+1+i}(X).$$

As it turned out, this decomposition remains valid even if X is not smooth nor projective. In contrast, A_{k}(E) = A_{k-r}(X), via the Gysin homomorphism, morally because that the fibers of E, the vector spaces, are contractible.

== See also ==
- Proj construction
- cone (algebraic geometry)
- ruled surface (an example of a projective bundle)
- Severi–Brauer variety
- Hirzebruch surface
