= Vafa–Witten equations =

In differential geometry in mathematics, the Vafa–Witten equations are the gauge field equations of Vafa–Witten theory, which is obtained as a topologically twisted N = 4 supersymmetric Yang-Mills theory (TT N = 4 SYM) using the Vafa–Witten twist. The Vafa–Witten equations are formulated on four-dimensional manifolds (short 4-manifolds), representing spacetime in physics, and as partial differential equations depend on its smooth structure. Considering the moduli space of its solutions, which are all solutions up to gauge, meaning physical equivalence, therefore encodes informations about it, similar to the much more well-known Yang–Mills moduli space and Seiberg–Witten moduli space. The Vafa–Witten equations are named after Cumrun Vafa and Edward Witten.

== Topological twist ==
A topological twist is a choice for how the four-dimensional spin group $\operatorname{Spin}(4)=\operatorname{SU}(2)\times\operatorname{SU}(2)$ acts on the canonical inclusion representation $\mathbf{4}\colon\operatorname{SU}(4)\hookrightarrow\operatorname{GL}_4(\mathbb{C})$ of the R-symmetry group, which relates the topology to the supersymmetry. The Vafa–Witten twist is then the splitting $(\mathbf{1},\mathbf{2})\oplus(\mathbf{1},\mathbf{2})$.

== Development ==
In 1988, Edward Witten developed topological quantum field theory (TQFT), a contribution listed for his Fields Medal in 1990, and used it to showed that Donaldson theory, a contribution listed for Simon Donaldson's Fields Medal in 1986, is a TT N = 2 SYM. In 1994, Nathan Seiberg and Edward Witten then constructed the dual TT N = 2 SYM, known as Seiberg–Witten theory. Both theories were very successful in describing smooth 4-manifolds. Later development then shifted from the N = 2 case with two inequivalent twists to the N = 4 case with three inequivalent twists. Besides the Vafa–Witten twist, these are the Donaldson–Witten twist ($(\mathbf{1},\mathbf{2})\oplus(\mathbf{1},\mathbf{1})\oplus(\mathbf{1},\mathbf{1})$) and the Kapustin–Witten twist ($(\mathbf{2},\mathbf{1})\oplus(\mathbf{1},\mathbf{2})$).

== Field equations ==
The bosonic fields of Vafa–Witten theory are a gauge field $A$ with field strength $F$, a scalar field $\Phi$ and a self-dual 2-form $B$. The Vafa–Witten equations are then given by:

$$F_{\mu\nu}^++\frac{1}{2}[C,B_{\mu\nu}^+]+\frac{1}{4}[B_{\mu\kappa}^+,B_{\nu\lambda}^+]g^{\kappa\lambda}=0;$$
$$D_\mu C+D^\nu B_{\mu\nu}^+=0.$$

== See also ==
- N = 1 supersymmetric Yang–Mills theory
- Seiberg–Witten equations
- Vafa–Witten theorem

== Literature ==
- Tanaka, Yuuji (2013). "Some boundedness properties of solutions to the Vafa-Witten equations on closed four-manifolds". Q. J. Math. 68: 1203–1225. arXiv:1308.0862. doi:10.1093/qmath/hax015.
- Tanaka, Yuuji (2014). "A perturbation and generic smoothness of the Vafa-Witten moduli spaces on closed symplectic four-manifolds". Glasg. Math. J. 61 (2): 471–486. arXiv:1410.1691. doi:10.1017/S0017089518000307.
- Clifford Henry Taubes (2017). "The behavior of sequences of solutions to the Vafa-Witten equations". arXiv:1702.04610 [math.DG].
- Manshot, Jan (2017). "Vafa-Witten theory and iterated integrals of modular forms". Communications in Mathematical Physics. 371 (2): 787–831. arXiv:1709.10098. doi:10.1007/s00220-019-03389-5.
- Manshot, Jan (2023). "Four-Manifold Invariants and Donaldson-Witten Theory". arXiv:2312.14709 [hep-th].
