= Kapustin–Witten equations =

In differential geometry in mathematics, the Kapustin–Witten equations are the gauge field equations of Kapustin–Witten theory, which is obtained as a topologically twisted N = 4 supersymmetric Yang-Mills theory (N = 4 SYM) using the Kapustin–Witten twist (or geometric Langlands twist due to its connection to the geometric Langlands correspondence). The Kapustin–Witten equations are formulated on four-dimensional manifolds (short 4-manifolds), representing spacetime in physics, and as partial differential equations depend on its smooth structure. Considering the moduli space of its solutions, which are all solutions up to gauge, meaning physical equivalence, therefore encodes informations about it, similar to the much more well-known Yang–Mills moduli space and Seiberg–Witten moduli space. The Kapustin–Witten equations are named after Anton Kapustin and Edward Witten, who developed them in 2007.

== Topological twist ==
A topological twist is a choice for how the four-dimensional spin group $\operatorname{Spin}(4)=\operatorname{SU}(2)\times\operatorname{SU}(2)$ acts on the canonical inclusion representation $\mathbf{4}\colon\operatorname{SU}(4)\hookrightarrow\operatorname{GL}_4(\mathbb{C})$ of the R-symmetry group, which relates the topology to the supersymmetry. The Kapustin-Witten twist is then the splitting $(\mathbf{2},\mathbf{1})\oplus(\mathbf{1},\mathbf{2})$.

== Development ==
In 1988, Edward Witten developed topological quantum field theory (TQFT), a contribution listed for his Fields Medal in 1990, and used it to showed that Donaldson theory, a contribution listed for Simon Donaldson's Fields Medal in 1986, is a TT N = 2 SYM. In 1994, Nathan Seiberg and Edward Witten then constructed the dual TT N = 2 SYM, known as Seiberg–Witten theory. Both theories were very successful in describing smooth 4-manifolds. Later development then shifted from the N = 2 case with two inequivalent twists to the N = 4 case with three inequivalent twists. Besides the Kapustin–Witten twist, these are the Donaldson–Witten twist ($(\mathbf{1},\mathbf{2})\oplus(\mathbf{1},\mathbf{1})\oplus(\mathbf{1},\mathbf{1})$) and the Vafa–Witten twist ($(\mathbf{1},\mathbf{2})\oplus(\mathbf{1},\mathbf{2})$).

== Field equations ==
The bosonic fields of Kapustin–Witten theory are a gauge field $A$ with field strength $F$ and 1-form $\phi$. The Kapustin-Witten equations are then given by:

$$(F-\phi\wedge\phi+tD\phi)^+=0;$$
$$(F-\phi\wedge\phi-t^{-1}D\phi)^-=0;$$
$$D^*\phi=0.$$

== See also ==
- N = 1 supersymmetric Yang–Mills theory
- Seiberg–Witten equations

== Literature ==
- Kapustin, Anton; Witten, Edward (2007). "Electric-magnetic duality and the geometric Langlands program". Communications in Number Theory and Physics. 1 (1): 1–236. arXiv:hep-th/0604151. Bibcode:2007CNTP....1....1K. doi:10.4310/cntp.2007.v1.n1.a1. S2CID 30505126.
- Kapustin, Anton (2007). "Langlands Duality and Topological Field Theory" (PDF). icmat.es.
- Witten, Edward (2008). "Mirror Symmetry, Hitchin's Equations, and Langlands Duality". The Many Facets of Geometry. pp. 113–128. arXiv:0802.0999. doi:10.1093/acprof:oso/9780199534920.003.0007. ISBN 978-0-19-953492-0.
- Manshot, Jan (2023). "Four-Manifold Invariants and Donaldson-Witten Theory". arXiv:2312.14709 [hep-th].
