= Kronheimer–Mrowka basic class =

In mathematics, the Kronheimer–Mrowka basic classes are elements of the second cohomology $H^2(M;\Z)$ of a simply connected, smooth 4-manifold $M$ of simple type that determine its Donaldson polynomials. They were introduced by Peter B. Kronheimer and Tomasz S. Mrowka (1994, 1995).

== Description ==
For a 4-manifold $M$, its Donaldson invariants are an integer $\gamma_0(M)\in\mathbb{Z}$ and maps $\gamma_d(M)\colon H_2(M,\mathbb{Z})\rightarrow\mathbb{Z}[1/2]$ (into half-integers), which combine into the Donaldson polynomial:

$$\mathcal{D}_M\colon H_2(M,\mathbb{Z})\rightarrow\mathbb{R},
\mathcal{D}_M(x)
=\sum_{d=0}^\infty\frac{\gamma_d(M)(x)}{d!}.$$

Peter Kronheimer and Tomasz Mrowka introduced a condition known as Kronheimer–Mrowka simple type (KM simple type), which is sufficient to obtain the separate Donaldson invariants from their common Donaldson polynomial. For a KM-simple manifold $M$ there are cohomology classes $K_1,\ldots,K_s\in H^2(M,\mathbb{Z})$, called Kronheimer–Mrowka basic classes (KM basic classes), as well as rational numbers $a_1,\ldots,a_s\in\mathbb{Q}$, called Kronheimer–Mrowka coefficients (KM coefficients), so that:

$$\mathcal{D}_M(x)
=\exp(Q_M(x,x)/2)\sum_{r=1}^sa_r\exp(K_r(x))$$

for all $x\in H_2(M,\mathbb{Z})$. Furthermore $w_2(M)=K_r\operatorname{mod}2\in H^2(M,\mathbb{Z}_2)$ for all Kronheimer–Mrowka basic classes.

Although this reduction of the infinite sum of the Donaldson polynomial to a finite sum in early 1994 brought a significant simplification to Donaldson theory, it was overhauled just a few months later in late 1994 by the development of Seiberg–Witten theory. Edward Witten, presented in a lecture at MIT, used a purely physical argument to conjecture that Kronheimer–Mrowka basic classes are exactly the support of the Seiberg–Witten invariants $\operatorname{SW}\colon \operatorname{Spin}^\mathrm{c}(M)\rightarrow\mathbb{Z}$ (hence the first Chern class $c_1\colon \operatorname{Spin}^\mathrm{c}(M)\rightarrow H^2(M,\mathbb{Z})$ of spin^{c} structures with a non-vanishing Seiberg–Witten invariant) and their Kronheimer–Mrowka coefficients are up to a topological factor exactly their Seiberg–Witten invariants. More concretely, it claims that a compact connected simply connected orientable smooth 4-manifold $M$ with $b_2^+(M)\geq 2$ odd is of Kronheimer–Mrowka simple type if and only if is of Seiberg–Witten simple type (meaning non-vanishing Seiberg–Witten invariants only come from zero-dimensional Seiberg–Witten moduli spaces by counting its points with a sign determined by their orientation). In this case the Donaldson polynomial is given by:

$$\mathcal{D}_M(x)
=\exp(Q_M(x,x)/2)\sum_{\mathfrak{s}\in\operatorname{Spin}^\mathrm{c}(M), \dim\mathcal{M}_{\mathfrak{s}}^\mathrm{SW}=0}2^{2+\frac{1}{4}(7\chi(M)+11\sigma(M))}\operatorname{SW}(M,\mathfrak{s})\exp(c_1(\mathfrak{s})(x)).$$
