= Seiberg–Witten moduli space =

Moduli space of the Seiberg–Witten equations

In gauge theory, the Seiberg–Witten moduli space (short SW moduli space, also monopole moduli space) is the moduli space of the Seiberg–Witten equations, hence the space of its solutions up to gauge. It is used to defined the Seiberg–Witten invariants used to study four-dimensional smooth manifolds (short 4-manifolds). A very useful property of the Seiberg–Witten moduli space is that it is always compact, which is an improvement over the previously used Yang–Mills moduli space and allowed to simplify the derivation of many results from Donaldson theory. The Seiberg–Witten moduli space is named after Nathan Seiberg and Edward Witten, who introduced the underlying Seiberg–Witten equations in 1994.

== Basics ==
Let $M$ be a compact orientable Riemannian 4-manifold with Riemannian metric $g\in\Gamma^\infty(S^2T^*M)$ and spin^{c} structure $\mathfrak{s}\colon M\rightarrow\operatorname{BSpin}^\mathrm{c}(4)$. Because of the exceptional isomorphism:

$$\operatorname{Spin}^\mathrm{c}(4)
\cong\operatorname{U}(2)\times_{\operatorname{U}(1)}\operatorname{U}(2)
=\{U^\pm\in\operatorname{U}(2)|\det(U^-)=\det(U^+)\}$$

the spin^{c} structure $\mathfrak{s}$ consists of two complex plane bundles $W^\pm\twoheadrightarrow M$, called associated spinor bundles (whose sections are called (anti) self-dual spinors), with same determinant line bundle $L=\det(W^\pm)$. Since the determinant line bundle preserves the first Chern class, one has $c_1(\mathfrak{s}) :=c_1(L) =c_1(W^\pm)$, which fulfills $c_1(\mathfrak{s})\operatorname{mod}2 =w_2(M)$. Given a fundamental class $[M]_\mathbb{Z} \in H_4(M,\mathbb{Z}) \cong\mathbb{Z}$ and its reduction $[M]_{\mathbb{Z}_2} :=[M]_\mathbb{Z}\operatorname{mod}2 \in H_4(M,\mathbb{Z}_2) \cong\mathbb{Z}_2$, one therefore has:

$$\sigma(M)\operatorname{mod}2
=w_2^2(M)[M]_{\mathbb{Z}_2}
=c_1^2(\mathfrak{s})[M]_\mathbb{Z}\operatorname{mod}2,$$

hence $c_1^2(\mathfrak{s})[M]_\mathbb{Z}-\sigma(M)$ is always even.

Let $\Omega_+^2(X)$ be the space of self-dual forms fulfilling $\star\eta=\eta$ and let $\mathcal{H}_+^2(X)$ be the vector subspace of additionally harmonic forms fulfilling $\Delta\eta=0$. Let $b_+(X)=\dim\mathcal{H}_+^2(X)$ be the self-dual Betti number, then there is a vector subspace $\Pi<\Omega_+^2(X)$ with $\operatorname{codim}\Pi=b_+(X)$ (using the Hodge decomposition), so that a self-dual form $\eta\in\Omega_+^2(X)$ is the self-dual part of the curvature form of a connection $A\in\Omega^1(X)$, hence:

$$\eta
=F_A^+
=\frac{1}{2}(\star\mathrm{d}A+\mathrm{d}A)$$

if and only if $\eta\in\Pi$. Both the vector subspace and this result play an essential role as they are the reason the Seiberg–Witten equations are perturbed with a self-dual form before considering their moduli space. Both also lead to topological obstructions since for $b_+(X)=0$ there is no complement and for $b_+(X)=1$ the complement is not connected.

Let $\Omega_-^2(X)$ be the analogous space of anti self-dual forms with $\star\eta=-\eta$ and $\mathcal{H}_-^2(M)$ be the analogous vector subspace of additionally harmonic forms fulfilling $\Delta\eta=0$. Let $b_-(M)=\dim\mathcal{H}_-^2(M)$ be the anti self-dual Betti number, then the second Betti number (from $\mathcal{H}^2(M) =\mathcal{H}_-^2(M)\oplus\mathcal{H}_+^2(M)$) and signature can be expressed as:

$$b_2(M)
=b_+(M)
+b_-(M);$$
$$\sigma(M)
=b_+(M)
-b_-(M).$$

Both formulas, which are later used to calculate the dimension of the moduli space, can also be reversed:

$$b_+(M)
=\frac{1}{2}(b_2(M)+\sigma(M));$$
$$b_-(M)
=\frac{1}{2}(b_2(M)-\sigma(M)).$$

== Configuration space ==
It is helpful to first consider the space of all possible solutions. Since the space of connections on the complex line bundle $L$ is an affine vector space, it is helpful to choose a single such connection $\mathrm{d}_A$ and express every other as being shifted from it by a form $ia\in\Omega^1(M,\mathfrak{u}(1))$ with $a\in\Omega^1(M)$ using $\mathfrak{u}(1)\cong i\mathbb{R}$. Self-dual spinors also form a vector space with the zero section providing a canonical center. Let the configuration space and reduced configuration space be:

$$\mathcal{A}
:=\{(\mathrm{d}_A-ia,\psi)|a\in\Omega^1(M),\psi\in\Gamma^\infty(W^+)\};$$
$$\mathcal{A}^*
:=\{(\mathrm{d}_A-ia,\psi)\in\mathcal{A}|\psi\neq 0\}.$$

Since the reduced configuration space $\mathcal{A}^*$ is an infinite dimensional vector space without a single point and hence homotopy equivalent to the infinite-dimensional sphere, it is contractible.

Although the definition of the reduced configuration space $\mathcal{A}^*$ is mainly motivated by the action of the gauge group below, its excluded cases are already important in the Seiberg–Witten equations themselves, which then reduced to the self-dual Yang–Mills equations.

== Gauge group ==
Smooth maps $g\colon M\rightarrow\operatorname{U}(1)$ act on the elements of the configuration space by:

$$g\cdot(\mathrm{d}_A-ia,\psi)
=(\mathrm{d}_A-ia+g\mathrm{d}(g^{-1}),g\psi).$$

Hence the gauge group can be taken as:

$$\mathcal{G}
:=C^\infty(M,\operatorname{U}(1)).$$

Using that the first unitary group $\operatorname{U}(1)$ is the Eilenberg–MacLane space $K(\mathbb{Z},1)$, which classifies singular cohomology, as well as the universal coefficient theorem and the Hurewicz theorem yields:

$$[M,\operatorname{U}(1)]
=[M,K(\mathbb{Z},1)]
=H^1(M,\mathbb{Z})
\cong\operatorname{Hom}(H_1(M,\mathbb{Z}),\mathbb{Z})
=\operatorname{Hom}(\pi_1(M)^\mathrm{ab},\mathbb{Z}).$$

Hence for $M$ simply connected or more generally if its fundamental group is perfect, every gauge is nullhomotopic and therefore has a global logarithm, meaning that for every smooth map $g\colon M\rightarrow\operatorname{U}(1)$ there exists a smooth map $u\colon M\rightarrow\mathbb{R}$ with $g=e^{iu}$. In this case, the action on the configuration space simplifies to:

$$e^{iu}\cdot(\mathrm{d}_A-ia,\psi)
=(\mathrm{d}_A-i(a+\mathrm{d}u),e^{iu}\psi).$$

For a base point $x_0\in M$, the gauge group can be separated as a product using the based gauge group:

$$\mathcal{G}_0
:=\{g\in\mathcal{G}|g(x_0)=1\};$$
$$\mathcal{G}
=\mathcal{G}_0\times\operatorname{U}(1).$$

As the product shows, the gauge group $\mathcal{G}$ is not contractible. But as the argument above shows, for $M$ simply connected, the based gauge group $\mathcal{G}_0$ is contractible.

== Moduli space ==
Since both the gauge group $\mathcal{G}$ and its subgroup, the based gauge group $\mathcal{G}_0$, act on the configuration space $\mathcal{A}$ and its subspace, the reduced configuration space $\mathcal{A}^*$, there are orbit spaces:

$$\mathcal{B}
:=\mathcal{A}/\mathcal{G};$$
$$\widetilde\mathcal{B}
:=\mathcal{A}/\mathcal{G}_0;$$
$$\mathcal{B}^*
:=\mathcal{A}^*/\mathcal{G};$$
$$\widetilde\mathcal{B}^*
:=\mathcal{A}^*/\mathcal{G}_0.$$

As the formula of the action above shows, the gauge group $\mathcal{G}$ doesn't act free on the configuration space $\mathcal{A}$, since the points with vanishing self-dual spinor field $\psi=0$ are invariant under all constant gauges $g=\mathrm{const}$, but it therefore does act free on the reduced configuration space $\mathcal{A}^*$ and the based gauge group $\mathcal{G}_0$ even acts free on both. $\mathcal{B}$ therefore has singularities, while the other spaces don't. If $M$ is simply connected, then $\widetilde\mathcal{B}$ can furthermore be identified with a vector subspace of the configuration space $\mathcal{A}$ by:

$$\widetilde\mathcal{B}
\cong\{(\mathrm{d}_A-ia,\psi)\in\mathcal{A}|\delta a=0\}.$$

Equivalently, for every $a\in\Omega^1(M)$, there is a unique smooth map $u\colon M\rightarrow\mathbb{R}$ with $\delta(a+\mathrm{d}u) =\delta a+\Delta u=0$, which can be shown again using the Hodge decomposition $C^\infty(M,\mathbb{R}) =\mathcal{H}_0(M)\oplus\delta\Omega^1(M)$ with $\mathcal{H}_0(M)$ just being the constant functions for $M$ connected.

Although the canonical projection $\widetilde\mathcal{B}\rightarrow\mathcal{B}$ might not be even be a fiber bundle due to the singularities, the canonical projection $\widetilde\mathcal{B}^*\rightarrow\mathcal{B}^*$, after a suitable Sobolev completion, is a principal U(1)-bundle. For $M$ simply connected, $\widetilde\mathcal{B}^*$ is contractible, since $\mathcal{A}^*$ always is and $\mathcal{G}_0$ is in this case as argued before. It then follows from the long exact sequence of homotopy groups of the principal $\operatorname{U}(1)$-bundle $\widetilde\mathcal{B}^*\rightarrow\mathcal{B}^*$, that $\mathcal{B}^*$ is an Eilenberg-MacLane space $K(\mathbb{Z},2)$ (as $S^1$ is a $K(\mathbb{Z},1)$) and since the infinite complex projective space $\mathbb{C}P^\infty$ is as well, there is a weak homotopy equivalence $\mathcal{B}^*\rightarrow\mathbb{C}P^\infty$. Homotopy classes of such maps are classified by $[K(\mathbb{Z},2),K(\mathbb{Z},2)]\cong\mathbb{Z}$ and the weak homotopy equivalence must correspond to a generator $\pm 1\in\mathbb{Z}$. But the principal $\operatorname{U}(1)$-bundle also bijectively corresponds to the homotopy class of a classifying map $f\colon\mathcal{B}^*\rightarrow \operatorname{BU}(1)\cong\mathbb{C}P^\infty$ with $\widetilde\mathcal{B}^*\cong f^*\operatorname{EU}(1)\cong f^*S^\infty$. It falls under the exact same classification, but doesn't necessarily correspond to a generator. It is exactly the first Chern class $c_1(\mathcal{B})\in H^2(\mathcal{B}^*,\mathbb{Z})\cong\mathbb{Z}$ of the principal $\operatorname{U}(1)$-bundle, but the perturbed Seiberg–Witten equations need to enter for it to be of use for the Seiberg–Witten invariants. Its moduli spaces are then given by the following subspaces of its solutions:

$$\mathcal{M}
:=\{[\mathrm{d}_A-ia,\psi]\in\mathcal{B}|(\mathrm{d}_A-ia,\psi)\;\text{fulfills SW eq.}\};$$
$$\mathcal{M}_\eta
:=\{(\mathrm{d}_A-ia,\psi)\in\mathcal{B}|(\mathrm{d}_A-ia,\psi)\;\text{fulfills pSW eq. with dis.}\;\eta\};$$
$$\widetilde\mathcal{M}_\eta
:=\{(\mathrm{d}_A-ia,\psi)\in\widetilde\mathcal{B}|(\mathrm{d}_A-ia,\psi)\;\text{fulfills pSW eq. with dis.}\;\eta\}.$$

With the canonical projection $\widetilde\mathcal{B}\rightarrow\mathcal{B}$, there is a canonical projection $\widetilde\mathcal{M}_\eta\rightarrow\mathcal{M}_\eta$. Since the former isn't a fiber bundle, it seems that the latter isn't as well. But this isn't necessarily the case and exactly the reason why the Seiberg–Witten equations are considered with a perturbation. For this, the self-dual Betti number is important:

- If $b_+(M)\geq 1$, then a perturbation $\eta\in\Omega_+^2(M)\setminus\Pi\neq\emptyset$ forces solutions of the perturbed Seiberg-Witten equations with $\psi=0$ to fulfill $F_A^+=\eta$, which is not possible due to $\eta\notin\Pi$. Hence both perturbed moduli spaces avoid all singularities in this case and $\widetilde\mathcal{M}_\eta\rightarrow\mathcal{M}_\eta$ becomes a principal $\operatorname{U}(1)$-subbundle of $\widetilde\mathcal{B}^*\rightarrow\mathcal{B}^*$ with first Chern class $c_1(\widetilde\mathcal{M}_\eta)\in H^2(\mathcal{M}_\eta,\mathbb{Z})$, which is then used to define the Seiberg–Witten invariants.
- If $b_+(M)\geq 2$, then any two perturbations $\eta_0,\eta_1\in\Omega_+^2(M)\setminus\Pi\neq\emptyset$ can furthermore be connected by a path $\gamma\colon[0,1]\rightarrow\Omega_+^2(M)\setminus\Pi$ with $\gamma(0)=\eta_0$ and $\gamma(1)=\eta_1$, which describes a bordism $\widetilde\mathcal{M}_{\eta_0}\rightarrow\widetilde\mathcal{M}_{\eta_1}$. Hence all perturbations give the same bordism class. (If $b_+(M)=1$, one has to choose a connected component of $\Omega_+^2(M)\setminus\Pi$, which might give two different bordism classes.)

For the Seiberg–Witten invariant, which is in particular Chern number, the necessary amount of cup products of the Chern class $c_1(\widetilde\mathcal{M}_\eta)\in H^2(\mathcal{M}_\eta,\mathbb{Z})$ with itself is evaluated with the fundamental class $[\mathcal{M}_\eta]\in H_{\dim\mathcal{M}_\eta}(\mathcal{M}_\eta,\mathbb{Z})$ of the moduli space in the Kronecker pairing. Since the Chern class has even degree, the moduli space must have even dimension for this to work and it furthermore has to be known precisely for the amount of cup products. First relating it to the index of the Dirac operator and then applying the Atiyah–Singer index theorem yields formulas containing the Euler characteristic and the signature:

- Let $M$ be simply connected. If $\operatorname{ind}(D_A^+)>0$ for $b_+(M)=0$ or $b_+(M)>0$, then $\mathcal{M}_\eta$ is an oriented smooth manifold with dimension:

$$\dim\mathcal{M}_\eta
=2\operatorname{ind}(D_A^+)
-b_+(M)
-1
=\frac{1}{4}(c_1^2(\mathfrak{s})[M]-2\chi(M)-3\sigma(M)).$$

While the first expression is obviously always an integer, it is more difficult to see for the second expression. But as shown in the basics, $c_1^2(\mathfrak{s})[M]_\mathbb{Z}-\sigma(M)$ is always even, which already makes the term in the brackets even as well.

- Let $M$ be simply connected. If $b_+(M)>0$, then $\widetilde\mathcal{M}_\eta$ is a compact oriented smooth manifold with dimension:

$$\dim\widetilde\mathcal{M}_\eta
=2\operatorname{ind}(D_A^+)
-b_+(M)
=\frac{1}{4}(c_1^2(\mathfrak{s})[M]-2\chi(M)-3\sigma(M))+1.$$

(Some literature uses the convention $L^2=\det(W^\pm)$ since it is indeed the square of a line bundle, which makes the above formula not include a factor in front of the Chern class.) Hence for $b_+(M)$ odd, $\dim\mathcal{M}_\eta$ is even and the Seiberg–Witten invariants, which are independent of the Riemannian metric $g$ and the perturbation $\eta$ as argued above for the latter, can then be defined as:

$$\operatorname{SW}(M,\mathfrak{s})
:=\langle c_1(\widetilde\mathcal{M}_\eta)^{\frac{\dim\mathcal{M}_\eta}{2}},[\mathcal{M}_\eta]\rangle
\in\mathbb{Z}.$$

== See also ==
- Monopole moduli space

== Literature ==
- Donaldson, Simon K. (1996), "The Seiberg-Witten equations and 4-manifold topology.", Bulletin of the American Mathematical Society, (N.S.), 33 (1): 45–70, doi:10.1090/S0273-0979-96-00625-8, MR 1339810
- Gompf, Robert E.; Stipcisz, András I. (1999). 4-Manifolds and Kirby Calculus. doi:10.1090/gsm/020. ISBN 978-1-4704-7455-3.
- Nicolaescu, Liviu I. (2000), Notes on Seiberg-Witten theory (PDF), Graduate Studies in Mathematics, vol. 28, Providence, RI: American Mathematical Society, doi:10.1090/gsm/028, ISBN 978-0-8218-2145-9, MR 1787219
- Perutz, Tim (May 2002). "Basics of Seiberg-Witten theory" (PDF). www.imperial.ac.uk.
- Kronheimer, Peter; Mrowka, Tomasz (2007). Monopoles and Three-Manifolds. Cambridge University Press. ISBN 978-0-521-88022-0.
- Moore, John Douglas (July 2010). "Lecture Notes on Seiberg-Witten Invariants (Revised Second Edition)" (PDF). web.math.ucsb.edu.
- Naber, Gregory L. (2011). Topology, Geometry and Gauge Fields. Applied Mathematical Sciences. Vol. 141 (Second ed.). Springer. doi:10.1007/978-1-4419-7895-0. ISBN 978-1-4419-7894-3. ISSN 0066-5452.
