= Morse homology =

Theory in differential topology

In mathematics, specifically in the field of differential topology, Morse homology is a homology theory defined for any smooth manifold. It is constructed using the smooth structure and an auxiliary metric on the manifold, but turns out to be topologically invariant, and is in fact isomorphic to singular homology. Morse homology also serves as a model for the various infinite-dimensional generalizations known as Floer homology theories.

== Formal definition ==
Given any (compact) smooth manifold, let f be a Morse function and g a Riemannian metric on the manifold. (These are auxiliary; in the end, the Morse homology depends on neither.) The pair $(f, g)$ gives us a gradient vector field. We say that $(f, g)$ is Morse–Smale if the stable and unstable manifolds associated to all of the critical points of f intersect each other transversely.

For any such pair $(f, g)$, it can be shown that the difference in index between any two critical points is equal to the dimension of the moduli space of gradient flows between those points. Thus there is a one-dimensional moduli space of flows between a critical point of index i and one of index $i-1$. Each flow can be reparametrized by a one-dimensional translation in the domain. After modding out by these reparametrizations, the quotient space is zero-dimensional — that is, a collection of oriented points representing unparametrized flow lines.

A chain complex $C_*(M, (f, g))$ may then be defined as follows. The set of chains is the Z-module generated by the critical points. The differential d of the complex sends a critical point p of index i to a sum of index-$(i-1)$ critical points, with coefficients corresponding to the (signed) number of unparametrized flow lines from p to those index-$(i-1)$ critical points. The fact that the number of such flow lines is finite follows from the compactness of the moduli space.

The fact that this defines a chain complex (that is, that $d^2 = 0$) follows from an understanding of how the moduli spaces of gradient flows compactify. Namely, in $d^2(p)$ the coefficient of an index-$(i-2)$ critical point q is the (signed) number of broken flows consisting of an index-1 flow from p to some critical point r of index $i-1$ and another index-1 flow from r to q. These broken flows exactly constitute the boundary of the moduli space of index-2 flows: The limit of any sequence of unbroken index-2 flows can be shown to be of this form, and all such broken flows arise as limits of unbroken index-2 flows. Unparametrized index-2 flows come in one-dimensional families, which compactify to compact one-manifolds with boundaries. The fact that the boundary of a compact one-manifold has signed count zero proves that $d^2(p)=0$.

== Invariance of Morse homology ==
It can be shown that the homology of this complex is independent of the Morse–Smale pair (f, g) used to define it. A homotopy of pairs (f_{t}, g_{t}) that interpolates between any two given pairs (f_{0}, g_{0}) and (f_{1}, g_{1}) may always be defined. Either through bifurcation analysis or by using a continuation map to define a chain map from $C_*(M, (f_0, g_0))$ to $C_*(M, (f_1, g_1))$, it can be shown that the two Morse homologies are isomorphic. Analogous arguments using a homotopy of homotopies shows that this isomorphism is canonical.

Another approach to proving the invariance of Morse homology is to relate it directly to singular homology. One can define a map to singular homology by sending a critical point to the singular chain associated to the unstable manifold associated to that point; inversely, a singular chain is sent to the limiting critical points reached by flowing the chain using the gradient vector field. The cleanest way to do this rigorously is to use the theory of currents.

The isomorphism with singular homology can also be proved by demonstrating an isomorphism with cellular homology, by viewing an unstable manifold associated to a critical point of index i as an i-cell, and showing that the boundary maps in the Morse and cellular complexes correspond.

== Related constructions ==
This approach to Morse theory was known in some form to René Thom and Stephen Smale. It is also implicit in John Milnor's book on the h-cobordism theorem.

From the fact that the Morse homology is isomorphic to the singular homology, the Morse inequalities follow by considering the number of generators — that is, critical points — necessary to generate the homology groups of the appropriate ranks (and by considering truncations of the Morse complex, to get the stronger inequalities). The existence of Morse homology "explains", in the sense of categorification, the Morse inequalities.

Edward Witten came up with a related construction in the early 1980s sometimes known as Morse–Witten theory.

Morse homology can be extended to finite-dimensional non-compact or infinite-dimensional manifolds where the index remains finite, the metric is complete and the function satisfies the Palais–Smale compactness condition, such as the energy functional for geodesics on a Riemannian manifold. The generalization to situations in which both index and coindex are infinite, but the relative index of any pair of critical points is finite, is known as Floer homology.

Sergei Novikov generalized this construction to a homology theory associated to a closed one-form on a manifold. Morse homology is a special case for the one-form df. A special case of Novikov's theory is circle-valued Morse theory, which Michael Hutchings and Yi-Jen Lee have connected to Reidemeister torsion and Seiberg–Witten theory.

== Morse–Bott homology ==
Morse homology can be carried out in the Morse–Bott setting, i.e. when instead of isolated nondegenerate critical points, a function has critical manifolds whose tangent space at a point coincides with the kernel of the Hessian at the point. This situation will always occur, if the function considered is invariant w.r.t. a non-discrete Lie group.

To describe the resulting chain complex and its homology, introduce a generic Morse function on each critical submanifold. Chains will consist of paths that begin in a critical manifold at a critical point of the auxiliary Morse function, following a gradient trajectory with respect to some metric, and then leave the submanifold to follow the gradient vector field of the Morse–Bott function until it hits some other critical manifold; it either flows for a while along a gradient trajectory associated to the Morse function on that critical submanifold and then flows to another critical submanifold, etc., or flows to a critical point in the original submanifold and terminates. See (Frauenfelder). This approach to Morse–Bott homology appeared in the context of unpublished work for contact homology by Bourgeois, in which the critical submanifolds are the sets of Reeb orbits, and the gradient flows between the critical submanifolds are pseudoholomorphic curves in the symplectization of a contact manifold asymptotic to Reeb orbits in the relevant critical manifolds of Reeb orbits. If we extend each Morse function to a function on the entire manifold supported near the critical submanifolds, we can explicitly write down a Morse–Smale function that perturbs the original Morse–Bott function. Namely, multiply each of the extended functions by some small positive constant, sum them and add the result to the original Morse–Bott function. The broken flows described above will be C^{0} close to the flow lines of this Morse–Smale function.
