= Tomasz Mrowka =

American mathematician

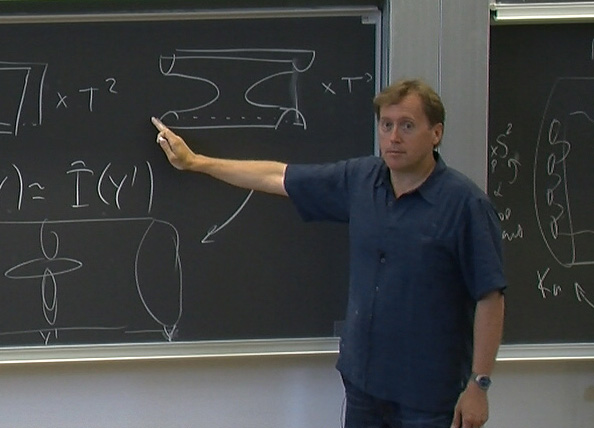
- Mrowka at Aarhus University, 2011
- Born: September 8, 1961 (age 65); State College, Pennsylvania, US
- Education: Massachusetts Institute of Technology (BS); University of California, Berkeley (PhD)
- Known for: Kronheimer–Mrowka basic class
- Awards: Fellow, American Academy of Arts and Sciences (2007); Veblen Prize (2007); Doob Prize (2011); Member, National Academy of Sciences (2015); Leroy P. Steele Prize for Seminal Contribution to Research (2023)
- Scientific career
- Fields: Mathematics
- Workplaces: Massachusetts Institute of Technology
- Thesis: A local Mayer-Vietoris principle for Yang-Mills moduli spaces (1988)
- Doctoral advisor: Clifford Taubes; Robion Kirby
- Doctoral students: Larry Guth; Lenhard Ng; Sherry Gong

Tomasz Stanislaw Mrowka (born September 8, 1961) is an American mathematician specializing in differential geometry and gauge theory. He is the Singer Professor of Mathematics and former head of the Department of Mathematics at the Massachusetts Institute of Technology.

Mrowka is the son of Polish mathematician Stanisław Mrówka, and is married to MIT mathematics professor Gigliola Staffilani.

== Career ==
A 1983 graduate of the Massachusetts Institute of Technology, he received the PhD from the University of California, Berkeley in 1988 under the direction of Clifford Taubes and Robion Kirby. He joined the MIT mathematics faculty as professor in 1996, following faculty appointments at Stanford University and at the California Institute of Technology (professor 1994–96). At MIT, he was the Simons Professor of Mathematics from 2007–2010. Upon Isadore Singer's retirement in 2010 the name of the chair became the Singer Professor of Mathematics which Mrowka held until 2017. He was named head of the Department of Mathematics in 2014 and held that position for 3 years.

A prior Sloan fellow and Young Presidential Investigator, in 1994 he was an invited speaker at the International Congress of Mathematicians (ICM) in Zurich. In 2007, he received the Oswald Veblen Prize in Geometry from the AMS jointly with Peter Kronheimer, "for their joint contributions to both three- and four-dimensional topology through the development of deep analytical techniques and applications." He was named a Guggenheim Fellow in 2010, and in 2011 he received the Doob Prize with Peter B. Kronheimer for their book Monopoles and Three-Manifolds (Cambridge University Press, 2007). In 2018 he gave a plenary lecture at the ICM in Rio de Janeiro, together with Peter Kronheimer. In 2023 he was awarded the Leroy P. Steele Prize for Seminal Contribution to Research (with Peter Kronheimer).

He became a fellow of the American Academy of Arts & Sciences in 2007, and a member of the National Academy of Sciences in 2015.

== Research ==
Mrowka's work combines analysis, geometry, and topology, specializing in the use of partial differential equations, such as the Yang-Mills equations from particle physics to analyze low-dimensional mathematical objects. Jointly with Robert Gompf, he discovered four-dimensional models of space-time topology.

In joint work with Peter Kronheimer, Mrowka settled many long-standing conjectures, three of which earned them the 2007 Veblen Prize. The award citation mentions three papers that Mrowka and Kronheimer wrote together. The first paper in 1995 deals with Donaldson's polynomial invariants and introduced Kronheimer–Mrowka basic class, which have been used to prove a variety of results about the topology and geometry of 4-manifolds, and partly motivated Witten's introduction of the Seiberg–Witten invariants. The second paper proves the so-called Thom conjecture and was one of the first deep applications of the then brand new Seiberg–Witten equations to four-dimensional topology. In the third paper in 2004, Mrowka and Kronheimer used their earlier development of Seiberg–Witten monopole Floer homology to prove the Property P conjecture for knots. The citation says: "The proof is a beautiful work of synthesis which draws upon advances made in the fields of gauge theory, symplectic and contact geometry, and foliations over the past 20 years."

In further recent work with Kronheimer, Mrowka showed that a certain subtle combinatorially defined knot invariant introduced by Mikhail Khovanov can detect “unknottedness.”

== See also ==
- List of Polish-Americans
