= Thom conjecture =

Theorem stating that smooth algebraic curve has minimum genus its homology class

In mathematics, a smooth algebraic curve $C$ in the complex projective plane, of degree $d$, has genus given by the genus–degree formula

$$g = (d-1)(d-2)/2$$.

The Thom conjecture, named after French mathematician René Thom, states that if $\Sigma$ is any smoothly embedded connected curve representing the same class in homology as $C$, then the genus $g$ of $\Sigma$ satisfies the inequality

$$g \geq (d-1)(d-2)/2$$.

In particular, C is known as a genus minimizing representative of its homology class. It was first proved by Peter Kronheimer and Tomasz Mrowka in October 1994, using the then-new Seiberg–Witten invariants.

Assuming that $\Sigma$ has nonnegative self intersection number this was generalized to Kähler manifolds (an example being the complex projective plane) by John Morgan, Zoltán Szabó, and Clifford Taubes, also using the Seiberg–Witten invariants.

There is at least one generalization of this conjecture, known as the symplectic Thom conjecture (which is now a theorem, as proved for example by Peter Ozsváth and Szabó in 2000). It states that a symplectic surface of a symplectic 4-manifold is genus minimizing within its homology class. This would imply the previous result because algebraic curves (complex dimension 1, real dimension 2) are symplectic surfaces within the complex projective plane, which is a symplectic 4-manifold.

== See also ==
- Adjunction formula
- Milnor conjecture (topology)
