= Circle-valued Morse theory =

In mathematics, circle-valued Morse theory studies the topology of a smooth manifold by analyzing the critical points of smooth maps from the manifold to the circle, in the framework of Morse homology. It is an important special case of Sergei Novikov's Morse theory of closed one-forms.

Michael Hutchings and Yi-Jen Lee have connected it to Reidemeister torsion and Seiberg–Witten theory.
