= Taubes's Gromov invariant =

In mathematics, the Gromov invariant of Clifford Taubes counts embedded (possibly disconnected) pseudoholomorphic curves in a symplectic 4-manifold, where the curves are holomorphic with respect to an auxiliary compatible almost complex structure. (Multiple covers of 2-tori with self-intersection 0 are also counted.)

Taubes proved the information contained in this invariant is equivalent to invariants derived from the Seiberg–Witten equations in a series of four long papers. Much of the analytical complexity connected to this invariant comes from properly counting multiply covered pseudoholomorphic curves so that the result is invariant of the choice of almost complex structure. The crux is a topologically defined index for pseudoholomorphic curves which controls embeddedness and bounds the Fredholm index.

Embedded contact homology is an extension due to Michael Hutchings of this work to noncompact four-manifolds of the form $Y \times \R$, where Y is a compact contact 3-manifold. ECH is a symplectic field theory-like invariant; namely, it is the homology of a chain complex generated by certain combinations of Reeb orbits of a contact form on Y, and whose differential counts certain embedded pseudoholomorphic curves and multiply covered pseudoholomorphic cylinders with "ECH index" 1 in $Y \times \R$. The ECH index is a version of Taubes's index for the cylindrical case, and again, the curves are pseudoholomorphic with respect to a suitable almost complex structure. The result is a topological invariant of Y, which Taubes proved is isomorphic to monopole Floer homology, a version of Seiberg–Witten homology for Y.
