= Frederi Viens =

American statistician, mathematician, and academic

Frederi G. Viens
- Occupations: Statistician, mathematician, and academic
- Honors: Franklin Fellow (2010)

Academic background
- Education: University of Paris; University of California, Irvine
- Doctoral advisor: René Carmona

Frederi G. Viens is an American statistician and mathematician, and academic. He is a professor in the Department of Statistics at Rice University, a founding member of the Diverse Rotations Improve Valuable Ecosystem Services Project, a senior research contributor to the Sustainability of Agrarian Societies in the Lake Chad Basin initiative, and moderator of the long-term scientific committee for the Seminar on Stochastic Processes conference series.

Viens' primary research areas are probability theory, stochastic processes, quantitative finance, and Bayesian statistics. His research collaboration has focused on different areas, including climate change, agro-ecology, agricultural economics, development economics, nuclear physics, and human medicine. He was named a Franklin Fellow at the US State Department in 2010 and Fellow of the Institute of Mathematical Statistics in 2013. He has an Erdős number of 3, via his co-authored paper with Paul Malliavin published in the Journal of Functional Analysis in 2010. His work has been published in journals, including Annals of Probability, Annals of Statistics and American Journal of Agricultural Economics.

== Education ==
Viens earned a Maîtrise in Pure Mathematics from the Université de Paris VII and a Master's degree in Mathematics from the University of California, Irvine, both in 1991. He completed his PhD in Mathematics from the University of California, Irvine in 1996, under the supervision of René Carmona. Following his doctorate, he held an NSF International Opportunities Postdoctoral Fellowship at the Universitat de Barcelona (1996–1997) and an NSF-NATO Postdoctoral Fellowship at the Université de Paris VI (1998–1999).

== Career ==
In 1997, Viens became an assistant professor of mathematics at the University of North Texas, holding this post until 2000. In 2000, he joined Purdue University's Departments of Statistics and Mathematics as an assistant professor, was promoted to associate professor there in 2003 and professor in 2008. He served as Associate Director (2000–2003) and then Director (2003–2016) of the Computational Finance MS Program at Purdue, and as Associate Director of the Actuarial Science Undergraduate Program from 2007 to 2010. In 2016, he was appointed professor at Michigan State University's Department of Statistics and Probability. In 2022, he joined Rice University, where he has been serving as full professor in its Department of Statistics, in the School of Engineering and Computing, and as Chair of the Department's Committee on Diversity, Equity, and Inclusion.

Viens was a science adviser for the Bureau of African Affairs at the US State Department from 2010 until 2011. Moreover, between 2015 and 2016, he served as program director in the Division of Mathematical Sciences at the US National Science Foundation. He also served as the chairperson of the Department of Statistics and Probability at Michigan State University between 2016 and 2020. At MSU, he also served as Adjunct Director of the Center for Statistical Training and Consulting (2018–2021) and Acting Director of the Data Science MS Program (2020–2022). He served as the director of the BS Program in Actuarial Science and Quantitative Risk Analytics from 2017 to 2022.

== Research ==
Viens' research spans several areas of mathematics, statistics, and their applications to the natural and social sciences.

Stochastic analysis

Viens has conducted research on stochastic processes, focusing on the existence and regularity properties of random processes in the context of stochastic differential equations. He has also demonstrated the consistency of statistical estimators in linear and nonlinear stochastic equations with long memory noise.

Quantitative finance and insurance

His research in quantitative finance has focused on improving the modeling of risk uncertainty in insurance and estimating stochastic volatility for stock option pricing, with findings offering insights for managing systemic risk in financial markets and improving risk management in financial sectors.

Nuclear physics

Viens has evaluated the predictive power of mathematical models to improve the quantification of nuclear binding and the nuclear saturation point.

Agricultural economics and agroecology

His research in agricultural and developmental economics has advanced mathematical models for estimating economic risks, using Bayesian hierarchical modeling to analyze U.S. agricultural R&D's impact on productivity, assess uncertainties in R&D lag structures, and explore long-term policy implications. His work in agroecology has examined how crop rotation diversity affects ecosystem resilience and agricultural productivity, contributing to the Diverse Rotations Improve Valuable Ecosystem Services (DRIVES) network.

Climate science

He has collaborated with climate scientists to help reconstruct Planet Earth's global mean surface temperatures over the past two millennia, including principled uncertainty quantification using Bayesian statistics. His research has also examined how climate variability influences the risk of armed conflict in specific regions. He has conducted extensive fieldwork on the Lake Chad Basin in West-Central Africa, collecting and analyzing agricultural data to help local communities adapt to environmental and social uncertainties.

Healthcare

His interdisciplinary research has also extended to healthcare, including studies on stakeholder incentive misalignment in the opioid crisis and the relationship between workplace bullying and patient safety outcomes in hospital settings.

== Personal life ==
Viens is married to Carolyn Johnston, a history professor at Michigan State University. They have a daughter. He and Johnston operate a small-scale sheep farm in Laingsburg, Michigan, which also received a humane farming grant from the Food Animal Concerns Trust in 2019. Viens has an Erdős number of 3, via his co-authored paper with Paul Malliavin published in the Journal of Functional Analysis in 2010.

== Awards and honors ==
- 2010 – Franklin Fellow, U.S. Department of State
- 2013 – Fellow, Institute of Mathematical Statistics
- 2013 – Inaugural College of Science Research Award, Purdue University
- 2021 – IMS Annals Quadfecta Twenty-Three Recognition, Institute of Mathematical Statistics
- 2024 – Wolfson Fellowship Senior Investigator, British Academy

== Bibliography ==
=== Books ===
- David, Claire; Mustapha, Sami; Viens, Frederi; Capron, Nathalie (2014). Mathematiques Pour Les Sciences de La Vie - Tout Le Cours En Fiches: 140 Fiches de Cours, 200 Exercices Corriges Et Exemples D'Applications (in French). Dunod. ISBN 978-2-10-059977-6.

=== Edited volumes ===
- Florescu, Ionut; Mariani, Maria C.; Stanley, H. Eugene; Viens, Frederi (2016). Handbook of High-Frequency Trading and Modeling in Finance. Wiley. ISBN 978-1-118-44398-9.
- Florescu, Ionut; Mariani, Maria C.; Viens, Frederi (2011). Handbook of Modeling High-Frequency Data in Finance. Wiley. ISBN 978-0-470-87688-6.

=== Selected articles ===
- Tindel, S.; Tudor, C.A.; Viens, F. (October 2003). "Stochastic evolution equations with fractional Brownian motion". Probability Theory and Related Fields. 127 (2): 186–204. doi:10.1007/s00440-003-0282-2.
- Tudor, Ciprian A.; Viens, Frederi G. (July 2007). "Statistical aspects of the fractional stochastic calculus". The Annals of Statistics. 35 (3). arXiv:math/0609295. doi:10.1214/009053606000001541.
- Chronopoulou, Alexandra; Viens, Frederi G. (May 2012). "Estimation and pricing under long-memory stochastic volatility". Annals of Finance. 8 (2–3): 379–403. doi:10.1007/s10436-010-0156-4.
- Barboza, Luis; Li, Bo; Tingley, Martin P.; Viens, Frederi G. (December 2014). "Reconstructing past temperatures from natural proxies and estimated climate forcings using short- and long-memory models". The Annals of Applied Statistics. 8 (4). arXiv:1403.3260. doi:10.1214/14-AOAS785.
- Ernst, Philip; Huang, Dongzhou; Viens, Frederi (2023). "Yule's "Nonsense correlation" for Gaussian random walks". Stochastic Processes and their Applications. 162: 423–455. doi:10.1016/j.spa.2022.09.002.
- Bybee-Finley, K. Ann; Muller, Katherine; White, Kathryn E.; Bowles, Timothy M.; Cavigelli, Michel A.; Han, Eunjin; Schomberg, Harry H.; Snapp, Sieglinde; Viens, Frederi (2024). "Rotational complexity increases cropping system output under poorer growing conditions". One Earth. 7 (9): 1638–1654. doi:10.1016/j.oneear.2024.07.010.
- Bagwell, Tyler E.; Dee, Sylvia G.; Luo, Xinyue; Stravato, Anna; Saikumar, Divya; Viens, Frederi; Lee, Bomi K.; O'Brien, Diana Z.; Mankin, Justin S. (May 2026). "Global and regional climate modes modulate armed conflict risk". Proceedings of the National Academy of Sciences. 123 (20) e2532935123. doi:10.1073/pnas.2532935123.
