= G. Peter Scott =

British mathematician

- Born: Godfrey Peter Scott; 1944; England
- Died: September 19, 2023 (aged 78–79); Michigan, United States
- Other name: Peter Scott
- Education: University of Oxford; University of Warwick
- Known for: Scott core theorem
- Awards: Senior Berwick Prize; Fellow of the American Mathematical Society
- Scientific career
- Fields: Mathematics
- Workplaces: University of Liverpool; University of Michigan
- Thesis: Some Problems in Topology (1969)
- Doctoral advisor: Brian Joseph Sanderson

Godfrey Peter Scott, known as Peter Scott, (1944 – 19 September 2023) was a British-American mathematician, known for the Scott core theorem.

== Education and career ==
He was born in England to Bernard Scott (a mathematician) and Barbara Scott (a poet and sculptor). After attending St Paul's School, London and completing his BA at the University of Oxford, Peter Scott received his PhD in 1969 from the University of Warwick under Brian Joseph Sanderson, with thesis Some Problems in Topology. Scott held appointments at the University of Liverpool from 1968 to 1987, at which time he moved to the University of Michigan, where he was a professor until his retirement in 2018.

His research dealt with low-dimensional geometric topology, differential geometry, and geometric group theory. He has done research on the geometric topology of 3-dimensional manifolds, 3-dimensional hyperbolic geometry, minimal surface theory, hyperbolic groups, and Kleinian groups with their associated geometry, topology, and group theory.

In 1973, he proved what is now known as the Scott core theorem or the Scott compact core theorem. This states that every 3-manifold $M$ with finitely generated fundamental group has a compact core $N$, i.e., $N$ is a compact submanifold such that inclusion induces a homotopy equivalence between $N$ and $M$; the submanifold $N$ is called a Scott compact core of the manifold $M$. He had previously proved that, given a fundamental group $G$ of a 3-manifold, if $G$ is finitely generated then $G$ must be finitely presented.

== Awards and honours ==
In 1986, he was awarded the Senior Berwick Prize by the London Mathematical Society. In 2013, he was elected a Fellow of the American Mathematical Society.

== Death ==
Scott died of cancer on 19 September 2023.

== Selected publications ==
- Compact submanifolds of 3-manifolds, Journal of the London Mathematical Society. Second Series vol. 7 (1973), no. 2, 246–250 (proof of the theorem on the compact core) doi:10.1112/jlms/s2-7.2.246
- Finitely generated 3-manifold groups are finitely presented. J. London Math. Soc. Second Series vol. 6 (1973), 437–440 doi:10.1112/jlms/s2-6.3.437
- Subgroups of surface groups are almost geometric. J. London Math. Soc. Second Series vol. 17 (1978), no. 3, 555–565. (proof that surface groups are LERF) doi:10.1112/jlms/s2-17.3.555
  - Correction to "Subgroups of surface groups are almost geometric J. London Math. Soc. vol. 2 (1985), no. 2, 217–220 doi:10.1112/jlms/s2-32.2.217
- There are no fake Seifert fibre spaces with infinite π_{1}. Annals of Mathematics Second Series, vol. 117 (1983), no. 1, 35–70 doi:10.2307/2006970
- Freedman, Michael; Hass, Joel; Scott, Peter (1982). "Closed geodesics on surfaces". Bulletin of the London Mathematical Society. 14 (5): 385–391. doi:10.1112/blms/14.5.385.
- Freedman, Michael; Hass, Joel; Scott, Peter (1983). "Least area incompressible surfaces in 3-manifolds". Inventiones Mathematicae. 71 (3): 609–642. Bibcode:1983InMat..71..609F. doi:10.1007/BF02095997. hdl:2027.42/46610. S2CID 42502819.
- with William H. Meeks: Finite group actions on 3-manifolds. Invent. Math. vol. 86 (1986), no. 2, 287–346 doi:10.1007/BF01389073
- Introduction to 3-Manifolds, University of Maryland, College Park 1975
- Scott, Peter (1983). "The Geometries of 3-Manifolds" (PDF). Bulletin of the London Mathematical Society. 15 (5): 401–487. doi:10.1112/blms/15.5.401. hdl:2027.42/135276.
- with Gadde A. Swarup: Regular neighbourhoods and canonical decompositions for groups, Société Mathématique de France, 2003
- with Gadde A. Swarup: Regular neighbourhoods and canonical decompositions for groups, Electron. Res. Announc. Amer. Math. Soc. vol. 8 (2002), 20–28 doi:10.1090/S1079-6762-02-00102-6
