= Brian White (mathematician) =

American mathematician

Brian Cabell White is an American mathematician who specializes in differential geometry and geometric measure theory. He is a professor of mathematics and a former chair of the mathematics department at Stanford University.

== Achievements ==
He played a key role in the solution of the double bubble conjecture, that the minimum-area enclosure of two volumes is formed from three spherical patches meeting in a circle and forming dihedral angles of 2π/3 with each other, by proving that the optimal solution to this problem is necessarily a surface of revolution.

White graduated from Yale University in 1977, as the top student in the sciences at Yale. He earned his Ph.D. from Princeton University in 1982, with a dissertation on minimal surfaces supervised by Frederick J. Almgren, Jr. After postdoctoral research at the Courant Institute of Mathematical Sciences of New York University, he became a faculty member at Stanford in 1983.

== Awards ==
He was awarded a Sloan Research Fellowship in 1985, and a Guggenheim Fellowship in 1999. He was an invited speaker at the International Congress of Mathematicians in 2002, speaking in the differential geometry section on the curve-shortening flow and mean curvature flow. In 2012, he was selected as one of the inaugural fellows of the American Mathematical Society.
