= Supersymmetric localization =

Technique in quantum mathematics

Supersymmetric localization is a method to exactly compute correlation functions of supersymmetric operators in certain supersymmetric quantum field theories such as the partition function, supersymmetric Wilson loops, etc. The method can be seen as an extension of the Berline–Vergne– Atiyah– Bott formula (or the Duistermaat–Heckman formula) for equivariant integration to path integrals of certain supersymmetric quantum field theories. Although the method cannot be applied to general local operators, it does provide the full nonperturbative answer for the restricted class of supersymmetric operators. It is a powerful tool which is currently extensively used in the study of supersymmetric quantum field theory. The method, built on the previous works by E.Witten, in its modern form involves subjecting the theory to a nontrivial supergravity background, such that the fermionic symmetry preserved by the latter can be used to perform the localization computation, as in.

Applications range from the proof of the Seiberg–Witten theory, or the conjectures of Erickson–Semenoff–Zarembo and Drukker–Gross to checks of various dualities, and precision tests of the AdS/CFT correspondence.
