= Joel Hass =

American mathematician

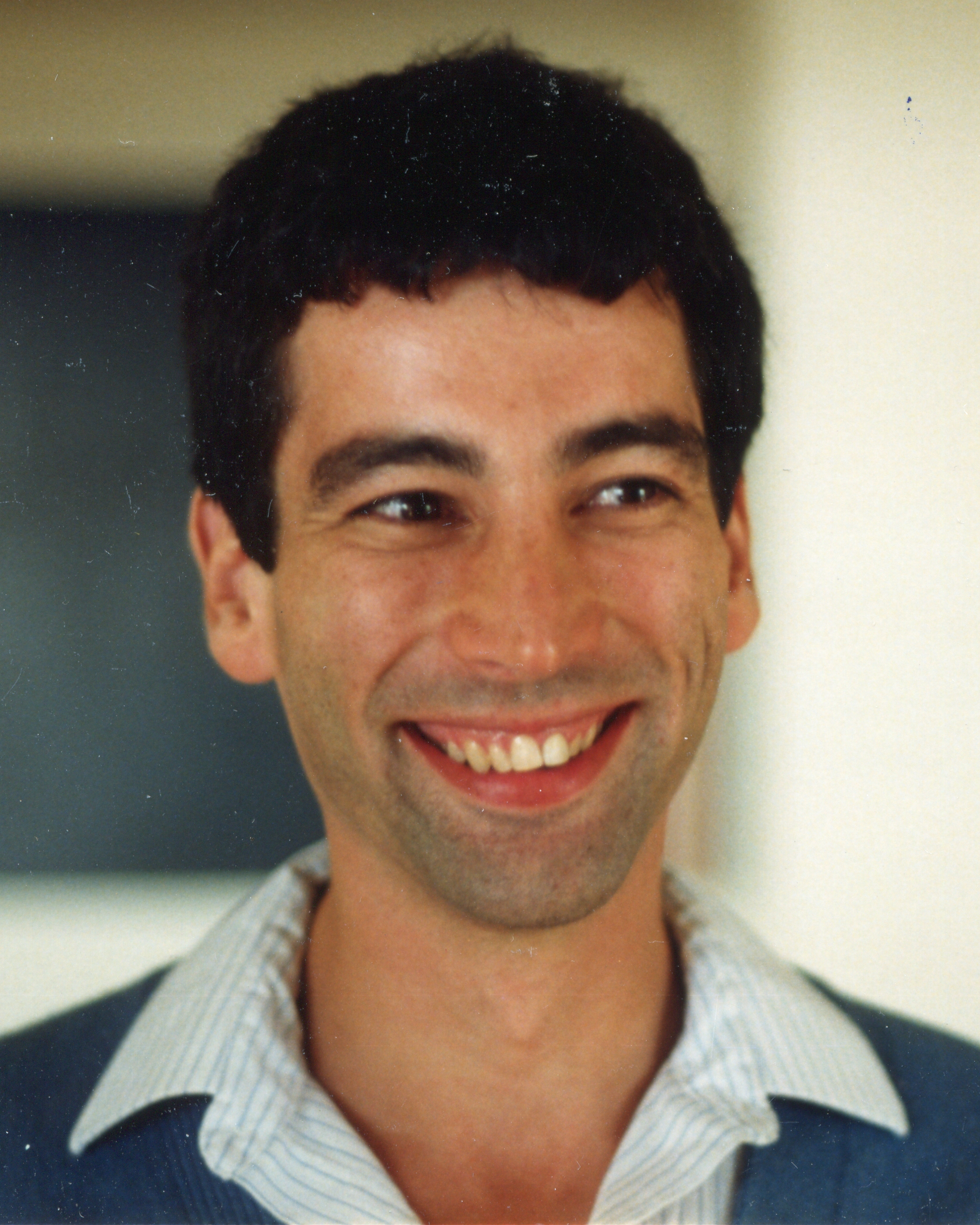
- Hass at Berkeley, circa 1987
- Born: January 3, 1956 (age 70); Tel Aviv
- Education: Columbia University; University of California, Berkeley
- Known for: Double bubble conjecture Unknotting problem Reidemeister moves
- Awards: Sloan Research Fellowship; Fellow of the American Mathematical Society
- Scientific career
- Fields: Mathematics, low-dimensional topology, geometry
- Workplaces: University of Michigan; Hebrew University of Jerusalem; University of California, Davis
- Thesis: Minimal surfaces in low dimensional manifolds (1981)
- Doctoral advisor: Robion Kirby
- Website: www.math.ucdavis.edu/~hass/

Joel Hass (born January 3, 1956) is an American mathematician and professor of mathematics at the University of California, Davis. His research focuses on low-dimensional geometry and topology, including 3-manifolds, minimal surfaces, knot theory, and computational complexity questions in topology.

== Education and career ==
Hass was born in Tel Aviv on January 3, 1956, to Julian and Aliza Hass, and attended public schools in Queens, New York, after his family emigrated to the United States. He spent parts of his childhood in England, and later entered Hunter College before transferring to Columbia University. Hass received a B.A. from Columbia University in 1976, an M.A. from the University of California, Berkeley in 1978, and a Ph.D. from Berkeley in 1981. His doctoral thesis, Minimal surfaces in low dimensional manifolds, was supervised by Robion Kirby.

After completing his doctorate, Hass held postdoctoral and visiting positions at the Hebrew University of Jerusalem, the University of Michigan, the Mathematical Sciences Research Institute, and the University of California, Berkeley. He joined the faculty of the University of California, Davis in 1988, became professor in 1994, and served as chair of the UC Davis Department of Mathematics from 2010 to 2014.

Hass was a member of the Institute for Advanced Study in 1990-1991, 2000-2001, and 2015-2016, and a research professor at MSRI in 2006. He also held visiting positions at the Technion, the University of Melbourne, and the Hebrew University of Jerusalem. From 2017 to 2020 he directed the UC Davis branch of COSMOS, a California summer program for high school students in mathematics and science. In 2021 he was one of the founders of the Association for Mathematical Research and served as its first president.

== Research contributions ==
Hass's work centers on low-dimensional topology and geometry. With Michael Freedman and Peter Scott, he proved foundational results on least-area incompressible surfaces in 3-manifolds.

Hass also constructed examples of bounded 3-manifolds admitting negatively curved metrics with concave boundary, a result highlighted in Robion Kirby's biography as an unexpected example in 3-dimensional geometry.

With Roger Schlafly, Hass proved the equal-volume case of the double bubble conjecture, showing that the standard double bubble minimizes surface area among enclosures of two equal volumes in three-dimensional Euclidean space.

Hass has also worked on algorithmic problems in knot theory and 3-manifold topology. With Jeffrey Lagarias and Nicholas Pippenger, he proved that the unknotting problem is in NP. With Lagarias, he gave an exponential upper bound on the number of Reidemeister moves needed to transform a diagram of the unknot into a standard circle. With Ian Agol and William Thurston, he proved that knot genus in 3-manifolds is NP-complete.

His later work includes applications of geometry and topology to biological shape analysis, including work with Patrice Koehl on conformal methods for comparing genus-zero surfaces and shapes arising from bones, proteins, and teeth.

== Awards and honors ==
- National Science Foundation Postdoctoral Fellow, 1984-1986
- Rothschild Fellow, 1987-1988
- Alfred P. Sloan Research Fellow, 1989-1991
- Fellow of the American Mathematical Society, class of 2013

== Selected publications ==
=== Research papers ===
- Freedman, Michael; Hass, Joel; Scott, Peter (1983). "Least area incompressible surfaces in 3-manifolds". Inventiones Mathematicae. 71 (3): 609–642. doi:10.1007/BF02095997. hdl:2027.42/46610.
- Hass, Joel (1994). "Bounded 3-manifolds admit negatively curved metrics with concave boundary". Journal of Differential Geometry. 40 (3): 449–459.
- Hass, Joel; Lagarias, Jeffrey C.; Pippenger, Nicholas (1999). "The computational complexity of knot and link problems". Journal of the ACM. 46 (2): 185–211. arXiv:math/9807016. doi:10.1145/301970.301971.
- Hass, Joel; Schlafly, Roger (2000). "Double bubbles minimize". Annals of Mathematics. Second Series. 151 (2): 459–515. arXiv:math/0003157. doi:10.2307/121042. JSTOR 121042.
- Hass, Joel; Lagarias, Jeffrey C. (2001). "The number of Reidemeister moves needed for unknotting". Journal of the American Mathematical Society. 14 (2): 399–428. arXiv:math/9807012. doi:10.1090/S0894-0347-01-00358-7.
- Agol, Ian; Hass, Joel; Thurston, William P. (2006). "The computational complexity of knot genus and spanning area". Transactions of the American Mathematical Society. 358 (9): 3821–3850. arXiv:math/0205057. doi:10.1090/S0002-9947-05-03919-X.
- Hass, Joel; Koehl, Patrice (2017). "Comparing shapes of genus-zero surfaces". Journal of Applied and Computational Topology. 1 (1): 57–87. doi:10.1007/s41468-017-0004-y.

=== Books ===
- Adams, Colin; Hass, Joel; Thompson, Abigail (1998). How to Ace Calculus: The Streetwise Guide. New York: W. H. Freeman. ISBN 978-0716731603.
- Adams, Colin; Hass, Joel; Thompson, Abigail (2001). How to Ace the Rest of Calculus: The Streetwise Guide. New York: W. H. Freeman. ISBN 978-0716741749.
- Thomas, George B.; Weir, Maurice D.; Hass, Joel (2014). Thomas' Calculus (13th ed.). Pearson.
