= René Carmona =

French mathematician

René Andre Carmona
- Born: August 6, 1947 (age 79); Marseille, France
- Title: Paul M. Wythes ’55 Professor of Engineering and Finance
- Awards: 2020 Joseph L. Doob Prize

Academic background
- Education: Aix-Marseille University
- Doctoral advisor: Leonard Gross

Academic work
- Doctoral students: Frederi Viens

René Andre Carmona (born August 6, 1947) is a French mathematician and professor at Princeton University who is known for developing a probabilistic approach for mean field games. He is a fellow of the Society for Industrial and Applied Mathematics, the American Mathematical Society and the Institute of Mathematical Statistics.

== Education ==
Carmona earned his undergraduate degree from the Aix-Marseille University in 1968 and would receive his Ph.D. from the same university in 1977. His thesis, Contribution à l'étude des mesures gaussiennes dans les espaces de Banach, was supervised by Leonard Gross.

== Career ==
Carmona's first academic job was at the Aix-Marseille University after he completed his Ph.D. He moved from Cornell University to Princeton University before taking a job as an assistant professor at the University of California, Irvine (UCI) in 1981. Carmona became a full professor by 1984 and was named a fellow of the Institute of Mathematical Statistics the following year. He stayed at UCI until 1995 when he accepted a professorship at Princeton.

In 2020, Carmona and François Delarue were awarded the Joseph L. Doob Prize by the American Mathematical Society for their two volume series Probabilistic Theory of Mean Field Games with Applications. The books were published in 2018 by Springer as part of the Probability Theory and Stochastic Modeling series. The books contain the motivation and background for understanding the probabilistic model for mean field games that Carmona and Delarue spent the last decade researching.

== Selected publications ==
- Carmona, René; Delarue, François (2018). Probabilistic Theory of Mean Field Games with Applications I. Probability Theory and Stochastic Modelling. Vol. 83. Springer. doi:10.1007/978-3-319-58920-6. ISBN 978-3-319-56437-1.
- Carmona, René; Lacroix, J. (1990). Spectral Theory of Random Schrödinger Operators (1 ed.). Boston, MA: Birkhäuser Boston. doi:10.1007/978-1-4612-4488-2. ISBN 1461244889.
- Carmona, René; Hwang, Wen-liang; Torrésani, Bruno (1998). Practical time-frequency analysis: Gabor and wavelet transforms with an implementation in S. San Diego, Calif.: Academic Press. ISBN 9780080539423.
