= Joseph L. Doob Prize =

American award for mathematics research books

The Joseph L. Doob Prize of the American Mathematical Society (AMS) awards $5,000 (U.S.) every three years for "a single, relatively recent, outstanding research book that makes a seminal contribution to the research literature, reflects the highest standards of research exposition, and promises to have a deep and long-term impact in its area." The prize, endowed in 2005 by Paul and Virginia Halmos, is named in honor of AMS President Joseph L. Doob, who was Paul Halmos's doctoral advisor in the department of mathematics at the University of Illinois. According to Paul Halmos, "Doob was the first well-informed modern mathematician in the department". In order for a mathematical research book to be eligible for the prize, it must have been published within the past 6 calendar years of the year of its nomination. The prize was originally named the AMS Book Prize, but after the first award was renamed the Doob Prize.

== Recipients ==
- 2005 —William P. Thurston for Three-dimensional Geometry and Topology (Princeton University Press 1997)
- 2008 — Enrico Bombieri and Walter Gubler for Heights in Diophantine Geometry (Cambridge University Press 2006)
- 2011 — Peter Kronheimer and Tomasz Mrowka for Monopoles and Three Manifolds (Cambridge University Press 2007)
- 2014 — Cédric Villani for Optimal Transport: Old and New (Springer Verlag 2009)
- 2017 — John Friedlander and Henryk Iwaniec for Opera de Cribro (AMS, 2010)
- 2020 — René Carmona and François Delarue for Probabilistic Theory of Mean Field Games with Applications (Springer, 2018)
- 2023 — Bjorn Poonen for "Rational Points on Varieties" (American Mathematical Society, 2017)
- 2026 — Semyon Dyatlov and Maciej Zworski for Mathematical Theory of Scattering Resonances (AMS 2019)
