= Frank Morgan (mathematician) =

American mathematician

- Education: MIT; Princeton University
- Known for: Proving Double Bubble conjecture
- Awards: National Science Foundation research grant (1977-2006, 2008-); First National Distinguished Teaching Award (1992); Princeton University, 250-Anniversary Visiting Professorship for Distinguished Teaching (1997–98)
- Scientific career
- Fields: Mathematics
- Workplaces: Williams College
- Doctoral advisor: Frederick Almgren Jr.

Frank Morgan is an American mathematician and the Webster Atwell '21 Professor of Mathematics, emeritus, at Williams College. He is known for contributions to geometric measure theory, minimal surfaces, and differential geometry, including the resolution of the double bubble conjecture. He was vice-president of the American Mathematical Society and the Mathematical Association of America.

Morgan studied at the Massachusetts Institute of Technology and Princeton University, and received his Ph.D. from Princeton in 1977, under the supervision of Frederick J. Almgren Jr. He taught at MIT for ten years before joining the Williams faculty.

In 1993 Morgan received the Deborah and Franklin Haimo Award for Distinguished College or University Teaching of Mathematics.

Morgan is the founder of SMALL, one of the largest and best known summer undergraduate Mathematics research programs. In 2012 he became a fellow of the American Mathematical Society.

Frank Morgan is also an avid dancer. He gained fame for his work "Dancing the Parkway".

== Mathematical work ==
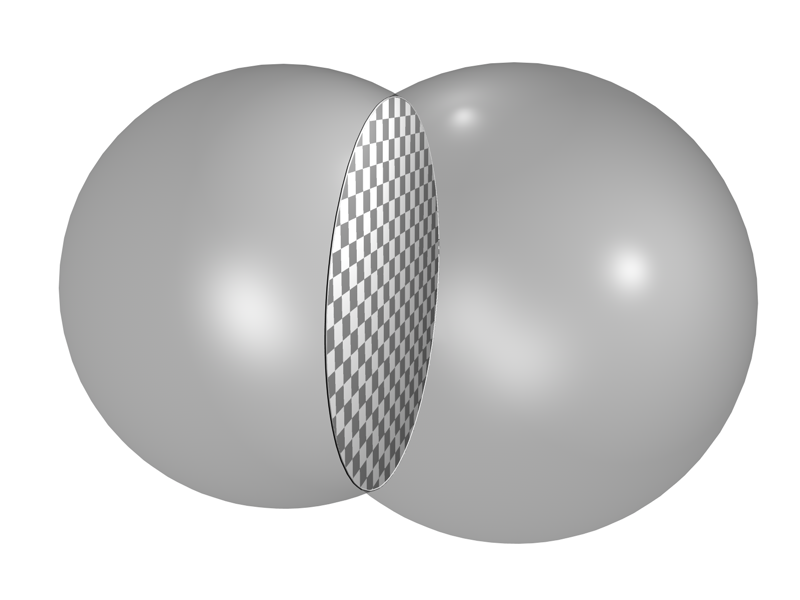
Double bubble

He is known for proving, in collaboration with Michael Hutchings, Manuel Ritoré, and Antonio Ros, the Double Bubble conjecture, which states that the minimum-surface-area enclosure of two given volumes is formed by three spherical patches meeting at 120-degree angles at a common circle.

He has also made contributions to the study of manifolds with density, which are Riemannian manifolds together with a measure of volume which is deformed from the standard Riemannian volume form. Such deformed volume measures suggest modifications of the Ricci curvature of the Riemannian manifold, as introduced by Dominique Bakry and Michel Émery. Morgan showed how to modify the classical Heintze-Karcher inequality, which controls the volume of certain cylindrical regions in the space by the Ricci curvature in the region and the mean curvature of the region's cross-section, to hold in the setting of manifolds with density. As a corollary, he was also able to put the Levy-Gromov isoperimetric inequality into this setting. Much of his current work deals with various aspects of isoperimetric inequalities and manifolds with density.

== Publications ==
=== Textbooks ===
- Calculus Lite. Third edition. A K Peters/CRC Press, Natick, MA, 2001. ISBN 1-56881-157-8
- Geometric measure theory. A beginner's guide. Fifth edition. Illustrated by James F. Bredt. Elsevier/Academic Press, Amsterdam, 2016. viii+263 pp. ISBN 978-0-12-804489-6
- The math chat book. MAA Spectrum. Mathematical Association of America, Washington, DC, 2000. xiv+113 pp. ISBN 0-88385-530-5
- Real analysis. American Mathematical Society, Providence, RI, 2005. viii+151 pp. ISBN 0-8218-3670-6
- Real analysis and applications. Including Fourier series and the calculus of variations. American Mathematical Society, Providence, RI, 2005. x+197 pp. ISBN 0-8218-3841-5
- Riemannian geometry. A beginner's guide. Second edition. A K Peters, Ltd., Wellesley, MA, 1998. x+156 pp. ISBN 1-56881-073-3

=== Notable articles ===
- Michael Hutchings, Frank Morgan, Manuel Ritoré, and Antonio Ros. Proof of the double bubble conjecture. Ann. of Math. (2) 155 (2002), no. 2, 459–489. doi:10.2307/3062123
- Frank Morgan. Manifolds with density. Notices Amer. Math. Soc. 52 (2005), no. 8, 853–858.
