= Geometry & Topology =

- Discipline: Geometry, Topology
- Language: English

Publication details
- History: 1997–present
- Publisher: Mathematical Sciences Publishers (UK)
- Open access: Delayed

Standard abbreviations
- ISO 4: Geom. Topol.

Indexing
- ISSN: 1465-3060 (print); 1364-0380 (web)

Links
- Journal homepage

Geometry & Topology is a peer-refereed, international mathematics research journal devoted to geometry and topology, and their applications. It is currently based at the University of Warwick, United Kingdom, and published by Mathematical Sciences Publishers, a nonprofit academic publishing organisation.

It was founded in 1997 by a group of topologists who were dissatisfied with recent substantial rises in subscription prices of journals published by major publishing corporations. The aim was to set up a high-quality journal, capable of competing with existing journals, but with substantially lower subscription fees. The journal was open-access for its first ten years of existence and was available free to individual users, although institutions were required to pay modest subscription fees for both online access and for printed volumes. At present, an online subscription is required to view full-text PDF copies of articles in the most recent three volumes; articles older than that are open-access, at which point copies of the published articles are uploaded to the arXiv. A traditional printed version is also published, at present on an annual basis.

The journal has grown to be well respected in its field, and has in recent years published a number of important papers, in particular proofs of the Property P conjecture and the Birman conjecture.
