= Virginia Halmos =

Virginia Halmos (1915–2015), born Virginia Pritchett, was an American philanthropist who supported mathematics research. She and her husband Paul Halmos endowed the American Mathematical Society's Joseph L. Doob Prize for research exposition. They also made substantial gifts to the Mathematical Association of America. In particular, they endowed the Mathematical Association of America's Euler Book Prize, which was first given in 2007. After her husband's death, Virginia Halmos donated funds to the Mathematical Association of America to support digitization of her husband's extensive archives.

Virginia Halmos (then Pritchett) earned an undergraduate degree at Vassar College. She went to graduate school at Brown University, where she studied logic. She left the graduate program in 1945 when she married Paul Halmos, but she maintained a strong interest in mathematics and the lives of mathematicians.
