= Scott core theorem =

On the finite presentability of fundamental groups of 3-manifolds

In mathematics, the Scott core theorem is a theorem about the finite presentability of fundamental groups of 3-manifolds due to G. Peter Scott, (Scott 1973). The precise statement is as follows:

Given a 3-manifold (not necessarily compact) with finitely generated fundamental group, there is a compact three-dimensional submanifold, called the compact core or Scott core, such that its inclusion map induces an isomorphism on fundamental groups. In particular, this means a finitely generated 3-manifold group is finitely presentable.

A simplified proof is given in (Rubinstein & Swarup 1990), and a stronger uniqueness statement is proven in (Harris & Scott 1996).
