= Anton Kapustin =

Russian-American physicist (born 1971)

- Born: Anton Nikolayevich Kapustin; November 10, 1971 (age 55); Moscow, Russian SFSR
- Education: Moscow State University (B.S.), California Institute of Technology (Ph.D.)
- Known for: Kapustin–Witten equations
- Children: Andrey Kapustin
- Scientific career
- Fields: Theoretical physics
- Workplaces: Moscow State University; California Institute of Technology; Institute for Advanced Study
- Thesis: Topics in Heavy Quark Physics (1997)
- Doctoral advisor: John Preskill

Anton Nikolayevich Kapustin (born November 10, 1971, Moscow) is a Russian-American theoretical physicist and the Earle C. Anthony Professor of Theoretical Physics at the California Institute of Technology. His interests lie in quantum field theory and string theory, and their applications to particle physics and condensed matter theory. He is the son of the pianist-composer Nikolai Kapustin.

== Education ==
Kapustin obtained a B.S. in physics from Moscow State University in 1993. He received a Ph.D. in physics from the California Institute of Technology in 1997 with John Preskill as his advisor.

== Research ==
He has made several contributions to dualities and other aspects of quantum field theories, in particular topological field theories and supersymmetric gauge theories. With Edward Witten, he discovered deep connections between the S-duality of supersymmetric gauge theories and the geometric Langlands correspondence, known as Kapustin–Witten theory. In recent years, he has focused on mathematical structures in and classification schemes of topological field theories and symmetry-protected topological phases.
