= Continuation map =

In differential topology, given a family of Morse-Smale functions on a smooth manifold X parameterized by a closed interval I, one can construct a Morse-Smale vector field on X × I whose critical points occur only on the boundary. The Morse differential defines a chain map from the Morse complexes at the boundaries of the family, the continuation map. This can be shown to descend to an isomorphism on Morse homology, proving its invariance of Morse homology of a smooth manifold.

Continuation maps were defined by Andreas Floer to prove the invariance of Floer homology in infinite dimensional analogues of the situation described above; in the case of finite-dimensional Morse theory, invariance may be proved by proving that Morse homology is isomorphic to singular homology, which is known to be invariant. However, Floer homology is not always isomorphic to a familiar invariant, so continuation maps yield an a priori proof of invariance.

In finite-dimensional Morse theory, different choices made in constructing the vector field on X × I yield distinct but chain homotopic maps and thus descend to the same isomorphism on homology. However, in certain infinite dimensional cases, this does not hold, and these techniques may be used to produce invariants of one-parameter families of objects (such as contact structures or Legendrian knots).
