= Vafa–Witten theorem =

Theorem concerning spontaneous symmetry breaking

In theoretical physics, the Vafa–Witten theorem, named after Cumrun Vafa and Edward Witten, is a theorem that shows that vector-like global symmetries (those that transform as expected under reflections) such as isospin and baryon number in vector-like gauge theories like quantum chromodynamics cannot be spontaneously broken as long as the theta angle is zero. This theorem can be proved by showing the exponential fall off of the propagator of fermions.

== See also ==
- F-theory
- Vafa–Witten equations
