= Michael Hutchings (mathematician) =

American mathematician

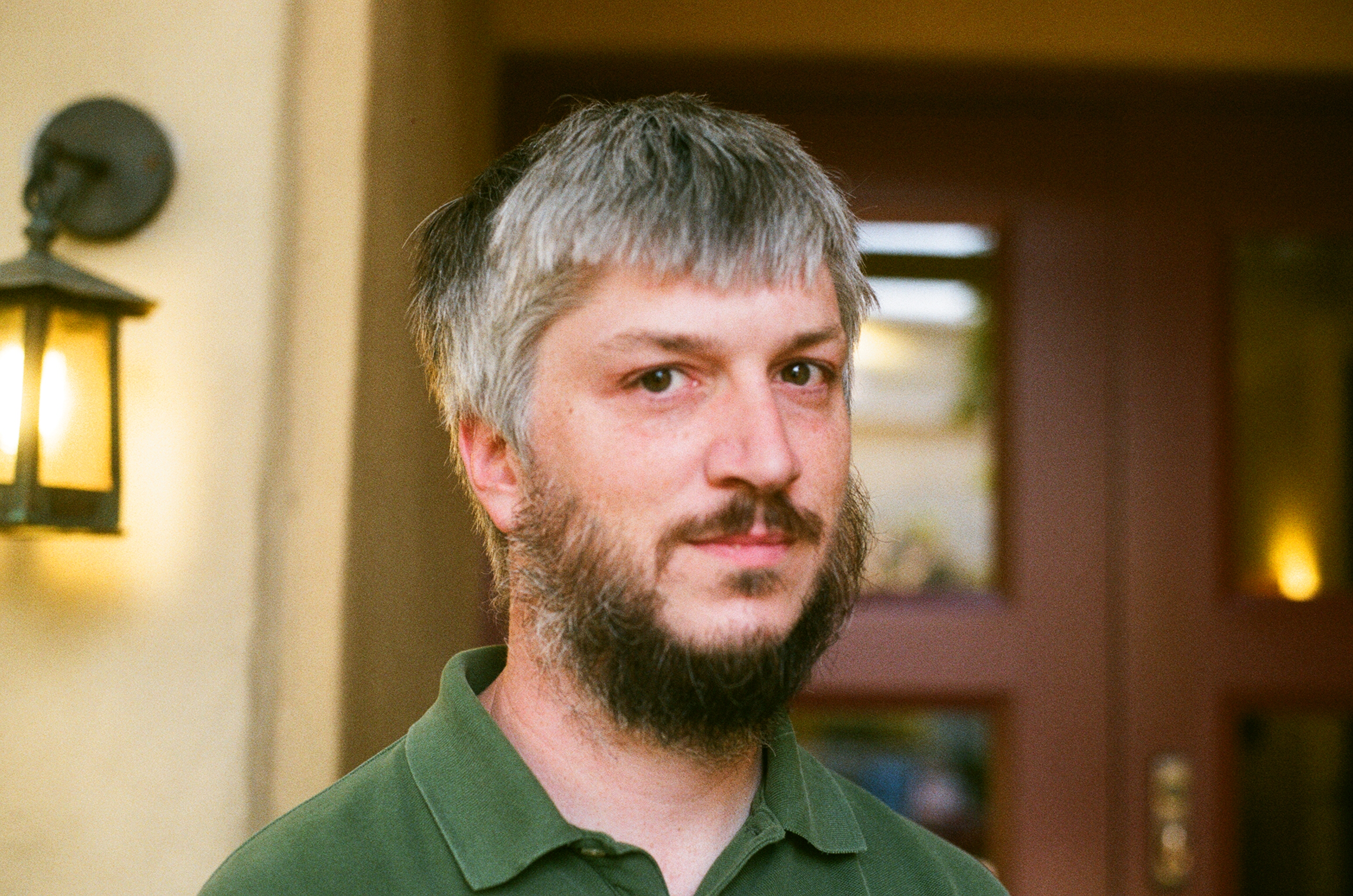
- Education: Harvard University
- Known for: Proof of the double bubble conjecture
- Scientific career
- Fields: Mathematics
- Workplaces: University of California, Berkeley
- Doctoral advisor: Clifford Taubes

Michael Lounsbery Hutchings is an American mathematician, a professor of mathematics at the University of California, Berkeley. He is known for proving the double bubble conjecture on the shape of two-chambered soap bubbles, and for his work on circle-valued Morse theory and on embedded contact homology, which he defined.

== Career ==
As an undergraduate student at Harvard University, Hutchings did an REU project with Frank Morgan at Williams College that began his interest in the mathematics of soap bubbles. He finished his undergraduate studies in 1993, and stayed at Harvard for graduate school, earning his Ph.D. in 1998 under the supervision of Clifford Taubes. After postdoctoral and visiting positions at Stanford University, the Max Planck Institute for Mathematics in Bonn, Germany, and the Institute for Advanced Study in Princeton, New Jersey, he joined the UC Berkeley faculty in 2001.

His work on circle-valued Morse theory (partly in collaboration with Yi-Jen Lee) studies torsion invariants that arise from circle-valued Morse theory and, more generally, closed 1-forms, and relates them to the three-dimensional Seiberg–Witten invariants and the Meng–Taubes theorem, in analogy with Taubes' Gromov–Seiberg–Witten theorem in four dimensions.

The main body of his work involves embedded contact homology, or ECH. ECH is a holomorphic curve model for the Seiberg–Witten Floer homology of a three-manifold, and is thus a version of Taubes's Gromov invariant for certain four-manifolds with boundary. Ideas connected to ECH were important in Taubes's proof of the Weinstein conjecture for three-manifolds. Embedded contact homology has now been proven to be isomorphic to both monopole Floer homology (Kutluhan–Lee–Taubes) and Heegaard Floer homology (Colin–Ghiggini–Honda). Hutchings has also introduced a sequence of symplectic capacities known as ECH capacities, which have applications to embedding problems for Liouville domains.

He won a Sloan Research Fellowship in 2003. He gave an invited talk at the International Congress of Mathematicians in 2010, entitled "Embedded contact homology and its applications". In 2012, he became a fellow of the American Mathematical Society.
