= Food Animal Concerns Trust =

Food Animal Concerns Trust (FACT) is a nonprofit organization in the U.S. concerned with food safety and animal welfare. FACT was founded in 1982 as the first U.S. organization devoted exclusively to addressing the public health problems that result from raising farm animals in confined and inhumane conditions.

== Mission ==
Food Animal Concerns Trust (FACT) promotes the safe and humane production of meat, milk, and eggs.

FACT envisions that all food-producing animals will be raised in a healthy and humane manner so that everyone will have access to safe and humanely-produced food.

== History ==
FACT was involved with some of the first calls for cage-free eggs in the U.S. food supply. In 1984, FACT launched the NEST EGGS Project. The project was designed to demonstrate that farmers would make money selling eggs from uncaged hens. The Nest Eggs Project produced eggs from approximately 675,000 hens without cages on its farms. In 1986, FACT then launched the Rambling Rose Brand Veal Project. FACT developed a husbandry system for raising veal calves on pasture instead of in crates. Currently, FACT operates a Humane Farming program and a Safe and Healthy Food program, while providing information to consumers.

== Humane Farming Program ==
FACT's Humane Farming program provides farmers with grants, conference scholarships, mentorship opportunities, and webinars. Typical past grant projects have focused on fencing, watering systems, or animal shelters in some way. Farmers have also completed a variety of unique projects involving constructing cattle scratching stations, planting trees to improve access to shade, and purchasing equipment for fly control. As of 2021, FACT has cumulatively awarded 257 grants to farmers in 44 states, and estimates that they have impacted more than 136,000 animals.

== Safe and Healthy Food Program ==
FACT works with the FDA and corporations to reduce the overuse of antibiotics on farms, and to combat the use of veterinary drugs that cause disease in humans. Issues include: encouraging popular restaurants to source their food from farms that use antibiotics responsibly, ensuring that the cancer-causing swine drug carbadox is withdrawn from the food supply, and encouraging the FDA to collect data from farms related to antibiotic use in order to inform analysis of antibiotic resistance in humans.
