= Determinant line bundle =

Construction for vector bundles

In differential geometry, the determinant line bundle is a construction that assigns, to every vector bundle over a paracompact space, a line bundle. Its name comes from using the determinant on their classifying spaces. Determinant line bundles naturally arise in four-dimensional spin^{c} structures and are therefore of central importance for Seiberg–Witten theory.

== Definition ==
Let $X$ be a paracompact space. Then there is a bijection between homotopy classes of maps from $X$ to the classifying space $BO(n)$ and equivalence classes of real vector bundles over $X$. That is, $[X,\operatorname{BO}(n)]\xrightarrow\cong\operatorname{Vect}_\mathbb{R}^n(X)$. This is defined via $[f]\mapsto f^*\gamma_\mathbb{R}^n$ with the real universal vector bundle $\gamma_\mathbb{R}^n$. The real determinant $\det\colon \operatorname{O}(n)\rightarrow\operatorname{O}(1)$ is a group homomorphism and hence induces a continuous map $\mathcal{B}\det\colon \operatorname{BO}(n)\rightarrow\operatorname{BO}(1)\cong\mathbb{R}P^\infty$ on the classifying space for O(n). Hence there is a postcomposition:

$$\det\colon
\operatorname{Vect}_\mathbb{R}^n(X)
\cong[X,\operatorname{BO}(n)]
\xrightarrow{\mathcal{B}\det_*}[X,\operatorname{BO}(1)]
\cong\operatorname{Vect}_\mathbb{R}^1(X).$$

Let $X$ be a paracompact space. Then there is a bijection between homotopy classes of maps from $X$ to the classifying space $BU(n)$ and equivalence classes of n-dimensional complex vector bundles over $X$. That is, $[X,\operatorname{BU}(n)]\xrightarrow\cong\operatorname{Vect}_\mathbb{C}^n(X)$. This is defined via $[f]\mapsto f^*\gamma_\mathbb{C}^n$ with the complex universal vector bundle $\gamma_\mathbb{C}^n$. The complex determinant $\det\colon \operatorname{U}(n)\rightarrow\operatorname{U}(1)$ is a group homomorphism and hence induces a continuous map $\mathcal{B}\det\colon \operatorname{BU}(n)\rightarrow\operatorname{BU}(1)\cong\mathbb{C}P^\infty$ on the classifying space for U(n). Hence there is a postcomposition:

$$\det\colon
\operatorname{Vect}_\mathbb{C}^n(X)
\cong[X,\operatorname{BU}(n)]
\xrightarrow{\mathcal{B}\det_*}[X,\operatorname{BU}(1)]
\cong\operatorname{Vect}_\mathbb{C}^1(X).$$

Alternatively, the determinant line bundle can be defined as the last non-trivial exterior product. Let $E\twoheadrightarrow X$ be a vector bundle, then:

$$\det(E)
:=\Lambda^{\operatorname{rk}(E)}(E).$$

== Properties ==
- The real determinant line bundle preserves the first Stiefel–Whitney class, which for real line bundles over topological spaces with the homotopy type of a CW complex is a group isomorphism. Since in this case the first Stiefel–Whitney class vanishes if and only if a real line bundle is orientable, both conditions are then equivalent to a trivial determinant line bundle.
- The complex determinant line bundle preserves the first Chern class, which for complex line bundles over topological spaces with the homotopy type of a CW complex is a group isomorphism.
- The pullback bundle commutes with the determinant line bundle. For a continuous map $f\colon X\rightarrow Y$ between paracompact spaces $X$ and $Y$ as well as a vector bundle $E\twoheadrightarrow Y$, one has:
  $$\det(f^*E)
\cong f^*\det(E).$$

Proof: Assume $E\twoheadrightarrow Y$ is a real vector bundle and let $g\colon Y\rightarrow\operatorname{BO}(n)$ be its classifying map with $E=g^*\gamma_\mathbb{R}^n$, then:

$$\det(f^*E)
\cong\det(f^*g^*\gamma_\mathbb{R}^n)
\cong\det((g\circ f)^*\gamma_\mathbb{R}^n)
\cong(\mathcal{B}\det\circ g\circ f)^*\gamma_\mathbb{R}^1
\cong f^*(\mathcal{B}\det\circ g)^*\gamma_\mathbb{R}^1
\cong f^*\det(g^*\gamma_\mathbb{R}^n)
\cong f^*\det(E).$$

For complex vector bundles, the proof is completely analogous.

- For vector bundles $E,F\twoheadrightarrow X$ (with the same fields as fibers), one has:
  $$\det(E\otimes F)
\cong\det(E)^{\operatorname{rk}(F)}\otimes\det(F)^{\operatorname{rk}(E)}.$$

== Literature ==
- Bott, Raoul; Tu, Loring W. (1982). Differential Forms in Algebraic Topology. Springer. doi:10.1007/978-1-4757-3951-0. ISBN 978-1-4757-3951-0.
- Freed, Daniel (1987-03-10). "On determinant line bundles" (PDF).
- Nicolaescu, Liviu I. (2000), Notes on Seiberg-Witten theory (PDF), Graduate Studies in Mathematics, vol. 28, Providence, RI: American Mathematical Society, doi:10.1090/gsm/028, ISBN 978-0-8218-2145-9, MR 1787219
- Hatcher, Allen (2003). "Vector Bundles & K-Theory".
