= Robert Gompf =

American mathematician

Robert Ernest Gompf (born 1957) is an American mathematician specializing in geometric topology.

Gompf received a Ph.D. in 1984 from the University of California, Berkeley under the supervision of Robion Kirby (An invariant for Casson handles, disks and knot concordants). He is now a professor at the University of Texas at Austin.

His research concerns the topology of 4-manifolds. In 1990, he demonstrated with Tomasz Mrowka that there is a simply connected irreducible 4-manifold that admits no complex structures. In 1995, he constructed new examples of simply connected compact symplectic 4-manifolds that are not homeomorphic or diffeomorphic to complex manifolds (Kähler manifolds).

He is a fellow of the American Mathematical Society. He was an invited speaker at the International Congress of Mathematicians in 1994 in Zurich (Smooth four-manifolds and symplectic topology).

== Writings ==
- With András I. Stipsicz: 4-manifolds and Kirby calculus, AMS 1999
- A new construction of symplectic manifolds, Annals of Mathematics, Volume 142, 1995, p. 527–595
- With Tomasz Mrowka Irreducible four manifolds need not be complex, Annals of Mathematics, Volume 138, 1993, p. 61–111
- Handlebody construction of Stein surfaces, Annals of Mathematics, Volume 148, 1998, p. 619–693
