= Property P conjecture =

Theorem in topology

In geometric topology, the Property P conjecture is a statement about 3-manifolds obtained by Dehn surgery on a knot in the 3-sphere. A knot in the 3-sphere is said to have Property P if every 3-manifold obtained by performing (non-trivial) Dehn surgery on the knot is not simply-connected. The conjecture states that all knots, except the unknot, have Property P.

Research on Property P was started by R. H. Bing, who popularized the name and conjecture.

This conjecture can be thought of as a first step to resolving the Poincaré conjecture, since the Lickorish–Wallace theorem says any closed, orientable 3-manifold results from Dehn surgery on a link. If a knot $K \subset \mathbb{S}^{3}$ has Property P, then one cannot construct a counterexample to the Poincaré conjecture by surgery along $K$.

A proof was announced in 2004, as the combined result of efforts of mathematicians working in several different fields.

== Algebraic Formulation ==
Let $[l], [m] \in \pi_{1}(\mathbb{S}^{3} \setminus K)$ denote elements corresponding to a preferred longitude and meridian of a tubular neighborhood of $K$.

$K$ has Property P if and only if its Knot group is never trivialised by adjoining a relation of the form $m = l^{a}$ for some $0 \ne a \in \mathbb{Z}$.
