= Seiberg–Witten theory =

Theory in supersymmetric gauge theory

In theoretical physics, Seiberg–Witten theory is an $\mathcal{N} = 2$ supersymmetric gauge theory with an exact low-energy effective action (for massless degrees of freedom), of which the kinetic part coincides with the Kähler potential of the moduli space of vacua. Before taking the low-energy effective action, the theory is known as $\mathcal{N} = 2$ supersymmetric Yang–Mills theory, as the field content is a single $\mathcal{N} = 2$ vector supermultiplet, analogous to the field content of Yang–Mills theory being a single vector gauge field (in particle theory language) or connection (in geometric language).

The theory was studied in detail by Nathan Seiberg and Edward Witten (Seiberg & Witten 1994).

== Seiberg–Witten curves ==
In general, effective Lagrangians of supersymmetric gauge theories are largely determined by their holomorphic (really, meromorphic) properties and their behavior near the singularities. In gauge theory with $\mathcal{N} = 2$ extended supersymmetry, the moduli space of vacua is a special Kähler manifold and its Kähler potential is constrained by above conditions.

In the original approach by Seiberg and Witten, holomorphy and electric-magnetic duality constraints are strong enough to almost uniquely constrain the prepotential $\mathcal{F}$ (a holomorphic function which defines the theory), and therefore the metric of the moduli space of vacua, for theories with SU(2) gauge group.

More generally, consider the example with gauge group SU(n). The classical potential is

$V(x) = \frac{1}{g^2} \operatorname{Tr} [\phi , \bar{\phi} ]^2 \,$	1

where $\phi$ is a scalar field appearing in an expansion of superfields in the theory. The potential must vanish on the moduli space of vacua by definition, but the $\phi$ need not. The vacuum expectation value of $\phi$ can be gauge rotated into the Cartan subalgebra, making it a traceless diagonal complex matrix $a$.

Because the fields $\phi$ no longer have vanishing vacuum expectation value, other fields become massive due to the Higgs mechanism (spontaneous symmetry breaking). They are integrated out in order to find the effective $\mathcal{N} = 2$ U(1) gauge theory. Its two-derivative, four-fermions low-energy action is given by a Lagrangian which can be expressed in terms of a single holomorphic function $\mathcal{F}$ on $\mathcal{N} = 1$ superspace as follows:

$\mathcal{L}_{\text{eff}}^{\mathrm{U}(1)} = \frac{1}{4\pi} \operatorname{Im} \left[ \int d^4 \theta \frac{d\mathcal{F}}{dA} \bar{A} + \int d^2 \theta \frac{1}{2} \frac{d^2 \mathcal{F}}{dA^2} W_\alpha W^\alpha \right] \,$	3

where

$\mathcal{F} = \frac{i}{2\pi} \mathcal{A}^2 \operatorname{\ln}\frac{\mathcal{A}^2}{\Lambda^2} + \sum_{k=1}^\infty \mathcal{F}_k \frac{\Lambda^{4k}}{\mathcal{A}^{4k}} \mathcal{A}^2 \,$	4

and $A$ is a chiral superfield on $\mathcal{N} = 1$ superspace which fits inside the $\mathcal{N} = 2$ chiral multiplet $\mathcal{A}$.

The first term is a perturbative loop calculation and the second is the instanton part where $k$ labels fixed instanton numbers. In theories whose gauge groups are products of unitary groups, $\mathcal{F}$ can be computed exactly using localization and the limit shape techniques.

The Kähler potential is the kinetic part of the low energy action, and explicitly is written in terms of $\mathcal{F}$ as

$K(A, \bar A) = \mathrm{Im}\left(\frac{\partial\mathcal{F}}{\partial A}\bar A\right).$	5

From $\mathcal{F}$ we can get the mass of the BPS particles.

$M \approx |na+ma_D| \,$	6

$a_D = \frac{d\mathcal{F}}{da} \,$	7

One way to interpret this is that these variables $a$ and its dual can be expressed as periods of a meromorphic differential on a Riemann surface called the Seiberg–Witten curve.

== N = 2 supersymmetric Yang–Mills theory ==
Before the low energy, or infrared, limit is taken, the action can be given in terms of a Lagrangian over $\mathcal{N} = 2$ superspace with field content $\Psi$, which is a single $\mathcal{N} = 2$ vector/chiral superfield in the adjoint representation of the gauge group, and a holomorphic function $\mathcal{F}$ of $\Psi$ called the prepotential. Then the Lagrangian is given by
$$\mathcal{L}_{SYM2} = \mathrm{Im}\mathrm{Tr}\left(\frac{1}{4\pi}\int d^2\theta d^2 \vartheta \mathcal{F}(\Psi)\right)$$
where $\theta, \vartheta$ are coordinates for the spinor directions of superspace. Once the low energy limit is taken, the $\mathcal{N} = 2$ superfield $\Psi$ is typically labelled by $\mathcal{A}$ instead.

The so called minimal theory is given by a specific choice of $\mathcal{F}$,
$$\mathcal{F}(\psi) = \frac{1}{2}\tau \Psi^2,$$
where $\tau$ is the complex coupling constant.

The minimal theory can be written on Minkowski spacetime as
$$\mathcal{L} = \frac{1}{g^2}\mathrm{Tr}\left(-\frac{1}{4}F_{\mu\nu}F^{\mu\nu} + g^2 \frac{\theta}{32\pi^2}F_{\mu\nu}*F^{\mu\nu} + (D_\mu\phi)^\dagger(D^\mu\phi) - \frac{1}{2}[\phi, \phi^\dagger]^2 - i\lambda\sigma^\mu D_\mu \bar \lambda - i \bar \psi \bar \sigma^\mu D_\mu \psi - i \sqrt{2}[\lambda, \psi]\phi^\dagger - i\sqrt{2}[\bar \lambda, \bar \psi] \phi\right)$$
with $A_\mu, \lambda, \psi, \phi$ making up the $\mathcal{N} = 2$ chiral multiplet.

== Geometry of the moduli space ==
For this section fix the gauge group as $\mathrm{SU(2)}$. A low-energy vacuum solution is an $\mathcal{N} = 2$ vector superfield $\mathcal{A}$ solving the equations of motion of the low-energy Lagrangian, for which the scalar part $\phi$ has vanishing potential, which as mentioned earlier holds if $[\phi, \phi^\dagger] = 0$ (which exactly means $\phi$ is a normal operator, and therefore diagonalizable). The scalar $\phi$ transforms in the adjoint, that is, it can be identified as an element of $\mathfrak{su}(2)_\mathbb{C} \cong \mathfrak{sl}(2, \mathbb{C})$, the complexification of $\mathfrak{su}(2)$. Thus $\phi$ is traceless and diagonalizable so can be gauge rotated to (is in the conjugacy class of) a matrix of the form $\frac{1}{2}a\sigma_3$ (where $\sigma_3$ is the third Pauli matrix) for $a \in \mathbb{C}$. However, $a$ and $-a$ give conjugate matrices (corresponding to the fact the Weyl group of $\mathrm{SU}(2)$ is $\mathbb{Z}_2$) so both label the same vacuum. Thus the gauge invariant quantity labelling inequivalent vacua is $u = a^2/2 = \mathrm{Tr}\phi^2$. The (classical) moduli space of vacua is a one-dimensional complex manifold (Riemann surface) parametrized by $u$, although the Kähler metric is given in terms of $a$ as
$$ds^2 = \mathrm{Im}\frac{\partial^2 \mathcal{F}}{\partial a^2}dad\bar a = \mathrm{Im}da_Dd\bar a = -\frac{i}{2}(da_D d\bar a - da d\bar a_D) =: \mathrm{Im}\tau(a)dad\bar a,$$

where $a_D = \frac{\partial \mathcal{F}}{\partial a}$. This is not invariant under an arbitrary change of coordinates, but due to symmetry in $a$ and $a_D$, switching to local coordinate $a_D$ gives a metric similar to the final form but with a different harmonic function replacing $\mathrm{Im}\tau(a)$. The switching of the two coordinates can be interpreted as an instance of electric-magnetic duality (Seiberg & Witten 1994).

Under a minimal assumption of assuming there are only three singularities in the moduli space at $u = -1, +1$ and $\infty$, with prescribed monodromy data at each point derived from quantum field theoretic arguments, the moduli space $\mathcal{M}$ was found to be $H/\Gamma(2)$, where $H$ is the hyperbolic half-plane and $\Gamma(2) < \mathrm{SL}(2, \mathbb{Z})$ is the second principal congruence subgroup, the subgroup of matrices congruent to 1 mod 2, generated by
$$M_\infty = \begin{pmatrix} -1 & 2 \\ 0 & -1\end{pmatrix}, M_1 = \begin{pmatrix} 1 & 0 \\ -2 & 1\end{pmatrix}, M_{-1} = \begin{pmatrix} -1 & 2 \\ -2 & 3\end{pmatrix}.$$
This space is a six-fold cover of the fundamental domain of the modular group and admits an explicit description as parametrizing a space of elliptic curves $E_u$ given by the vanishing of
$$y^2 = (x - 1)(x + 1)(x - u),$$
which are the Seiberg–Witten curves. The curve becomes singular precisely when $u = -1, +1$ or $\infty$.

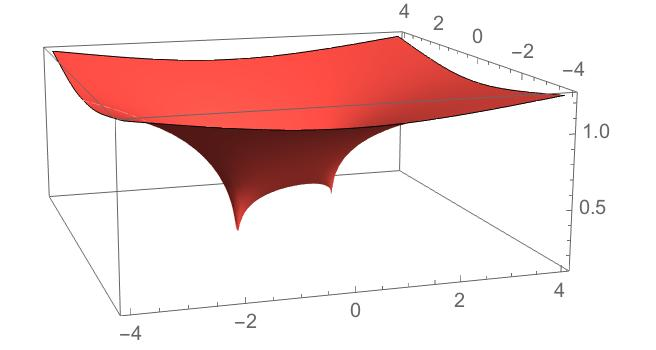
Graph of metric function $\mathrm{Im}\tau(u)$ on moduli space parametrized by $u$, with evident singularities at $u = -1, +1$. The function $\tau$ is defined using the complete elliptic integral of the first kind (Hunter-Jones 2012).

== Monopole condensation and confinement ==
The theory exhibits physical phenomena involving and linking magnetic monopoles, confinement, an attained mass gap and strong-weak duality, described in section 5.6 of Seiberg and Witten (1994). The study of these physical phenomena also motivated the theory of Seiberg–Witten invariants.

The low-energy action is described by the $\mathcal{N} = 2$ chiral multiplet $\mathcal{A}$ with gauge group $\mathrm{U}(1)$, the residual unbroken gauge from the original $\mathrm{SU}(2)$ symmetry. This description is weakly coupled for large $u$, but strongly coupled for small $u$. However, at the strongly coupled point the theory admits a dual description which is weakly coupled. The dual theory has different field content, with two $\mathcal{N} = 1$ chiral superfields $M, \tilde M$, and gauge field the dual photon $\mathcal{A}_D$, with a potential that gives equations of motion which are Witten's monopole equations, also known as the Seiberg–Witten equations at the critical points $u = \pm u_0$ where the monopoles become massless.

In the context of Seiberg–Witten invariants, one can view Donaldson invariants as coming from a twist of the original theory at $u = \infty$ giving a topological field theory. On the other hand, Seiberg–Witten invariants come from twisting the dual theory at $u = \pm u_0$. In theory, such invariants should receive contributions from all finite $u$ but in fact can be localized to the two critical points, and topological invariants can be read off from solution spaces to the monopole equations.

== Relation to integrable systems ==
The special Kähler geometry on the moduli space of vacua in Seiberg–Witten theory can be identified with the geometry of the base of complex completely integrable system. The total phase of this complex completely integrable system can be identified with the moduli space of vacua of the 4d theory compactified on a circle. The relation between Seiberg–Witten theory and integrable systems has been reviewed by Eric D'Hoker and D. H. Phong. See Hitchin system.

== Seiberg–Witten prepotential via instanton counting ==
Using supersymmetric localisation techniques, one can explicitly determine the instanton partition function of $\mathcal{N}=2$ super Yang–Mills theory. The Seiberg–Witten prepotential can then be extracted using the localization approach of Nikita Nekrasov. It arises in the flat space limit $\varepsilon_{1}$, $\varepsilon_{2} \to 0$, of the partition function of the theory subject to the so-called $\Omega$-background. The latter is a specific background of four dimensional $\mathcal{N}=2$ supergravity. It can be engineered, formally by lifting the super Yang–Mills theory to six dimensions, then compactifying on 2-torus, while twisting the four dimensional spacetime around the two non-contractible cycles. In addition, one twists fermions so as to produce covariantly constant spinors generating unbroken supersymmetries. The two parameters $\varepsilon_{1}$, $\varepsilon_{2}$ of the $\Omega$-background correspond to the angles of the spacetime rotation.

In Ω-background, all the non-zero modes can be integrated out, so the path integral with the boundary condition $\phi \to a$ at $x \to \infty$ can be expressed as a sum over instanton number of the products and ratios of fermionic and bosonic determinants, producing the so-called Nekrasov partition function. In the limit where $\varepsilon_{1}$, $\varepsilon_{2}$ approach 0, this sum is dominated by a unique saddle point. On the other hand, when $\varepsilon_{1}$, $\varepsilon_{2}$ approach 0,

$Z(a;\varepsilon_{1},\varepsilon_{2},\Lambda)=\exp \left( -\frac{1}{\varepsilon_{1}\varepsilon_{2}}\left(\mathcal{F}(a;\Lambda)+\mathcal{O}(\varepsilon_{1},\varepsilon_{2}) \right) \right)\,$	8

holds.

== See also ==
- Ginzburg–Landau theory
- Donaldson theory
- Vafa–Witten theory
- Kapustin–Witten theory
- Seven-dimensional Seiberg–Witten theory
- Eight-dimensional Seiberg–Witten theory
