= Donaldson theory =

Study in mathematical gauge theory

In mathematics, and especially gauge theory, Donaldson theory is the study of the topology of smooth 4-manifolds using moduli spaces of anti-self-dual instantons. It was started by Simon Donaldson (1983) who proved Donaldson's theorem restricting the possible quadratic forms on the second cohomology group of a compact simply connected 4-manifold. Important consequences of this theorem include the existence of an exotic R^{4} and the failure of the smooth h-cobordism theorem in 4 dimensions. The results of Donaldson theory depend therefore on the manifold having a differential structure, and are largely false for topological 4-manifolds.

Many of the theorems in Donaldson theory can now be proved more easily using Seiberg–Witten theory, though there are a number of open problems remaining in Donaldson theory, such as the Witten conjecture and the Atiyah–Floer conjecture.

== See also ==
- Kronheimer–Mrowka basic class
- Instanton
- Floer homology
- Yang–Mills equations
