= Seiberg–Witten invariants =

4-manifold invariants

In mathematics, and especially gauge theory, Seiberg–Witten invariants are invariants of compact smooth oriented 4-manifolds introduced by Edward Witten (1994), using the Seiberg–Witten theory studied by Nathan Seiberg and Witten (1994a, 1994b) during their investigations of Seiberg–Witten gauge theory.

Seiberg–Witten invariants are similar to Donaldson invariants and can be used to prove similar (but sometimes slightly stronger) results about smooth 4-manifolds. They are technically much easier to work with than Donaldson invariants; for example, the Seiberg–Witten moduli space of solutions of the Seiberg–Witten equations up to gauge tends to be compact, so one avoids the hard problems involved in compactifying the Yang–Mills moduli space of solutions of the Yang–Mills equations up to gauge in Donaldson theory.

For detailed descriptions of Seiberg–Witten invariants see (Donaldson 1996), (Moore 2001), (Morgan 1996), (Nicolaescu 2000), (Scorpan 2005, Chapter 10). For the relation to symplectic manifolds and Gromov–Witten invariants see (Taubes 2000). For the early history see (Jackson 1995).

== Spin^{c} structures ==
The fourth spin^{c} group is

$$\operatorname{Spin}^\mathrm{c}(4)
=(\operatorname{Spin}(4)\times\operatorname{U}(1))/\Z_2
\cong\operatorname{U}(2)\times_{\operatorname{U}(1)}\operatorname{U}(2)$$

where the $\Z/2\Z$ acts as a sign on both factors. The group has a natural homomorphism to SO(4) = Spin(4)/±1.

Given a compact oriented 4 manifold, choose a smooth Riemannian metric $g$ with Levi Civita connection $\nabla^{g}$. This reduces the structure group from the connected component GL(4)_{+} to SO(4) and is harmless from a homotopical point of view. A spin^{c} structure or complex spin structure on M is a reduction of the structure group to Spin^{c}, i.e. a lift of the SO(4) structure on the tangent bundle to the group Spin^{c}. By a theorem of Hirzebruch and Hopf, every smooth oriented compact 4-manifold $M$ admits a Spin^{c} structure. The existence of a Spin^{c} structure is equivalent to the existence of a lift of the second Stiefel–Whitney class $w_2(M) \in H^2(M,\Z/2\Z)$ to a class $K \in H^2(M, \Z).$ Conversely such a lift determines the Spin^{c} structure up to 2 torsion in $H^2(M,\Z).$ A spin structure proper requires the more restrictive $w_2(M) = 0.$

A Spin^{c} structure determines (and is determined by) a spinor bundle $W = W^+ \oplus W^-$ coming from the 2 complex dimensional positive and negative spinor representation of Spin(4) on which U(1) acts by multiplication. We have $K = c_1(W^+) = c_1(W^-)$. The spinor bundle $W$ comes with a graded Clifford algebra bundle representation i.e. a map $\gamma:\mathrm{Cliff}(M, g) \to \mathcal{E}\mathit{nd}(W)$ such that for each 1 form $a$ we have $\gamma(a):W^\pm \to W^\mp$ and $\gamma(a)^2 = - g(a, a)$. There is a unique hermitian metric $h$ on $W$ s.t. $\gamma(a)$ is skew Hermitian for real 1 forms $a$. It gives an induced action of the forms $\wedge^* M$ by anti-symmetrising. In particular this gives an isomorphism of $\wedge^+ M \cong \mathcal{E}\mathit{nd}^{sh}_0(W^+)$ of the selfdual two forms with the traceless skew Hermitian endomorphisms of $W^+$ which are then identified.

== Seiberg–Witten equations ==
Let $L = \det(W^+) \equiv \det(W^-)$ be the determinant line bundle with $c_1(L) = K$. For every connection $\nabla_{A} = \nabla_0 + A$ with $A \in iA^1_{\R}(M)$ on $L$, there is a unique spinor connection $\nabla^{A}$ on $W$ i.e. a connection such that $\nabla^{A}_X(\gamma(a)) := [\nabla^{A}_X, \gamma(a)] = \gamma(\nabla^{g}_X a)$ for every 1-form $a$ and vector field $X$. The Clifford connection then defines a Dirac operator $D^A = \gamma \otimes 1 \circ \nabla^A = \gamma(dx^\mu)\nabla^A_\mu$ on $W$. The group of maps $\mathcal{G} = \{u: M \to U(1)\}$ acts as a gauge group on the set of all connections on $L$. The action of $\mathcal{G}$ can be "gauge fixed" e.g. by the condition $d^*A = 0$, leaving an effective parametrisation of the space of all such connections of $H^1(M,\R)^{\mathrm{harm}}/H^1(M,\Z) \oplus d^* A^+_{\R}(M)$ with a residual $U(1)$ gauge group action.

Write $\phi$ for a spinor field of positive chirality, i.e. a section of $W^+$. The Seiberg–Witten equations for $(\phi, \nabla^A)$ are now

$$D^A\phi=0$$
$$F^+_A=\sigma(\phi) + i\omega$$

Here $F^A \in iA^2_{\R}(M)$ is the closed curvature 2-form of $\nabla^A$, $F^+_A$ is its self-dual part, and σ is the squaring map $\phi\mapsto \left (\phi h(\phi, -) -\tfrac12 h(\phi, \phi)1_{W^+} \right)$ from $W^+$ to the a traceless Hermitian endomorphism of $W^+$ identified with an imaginary self-dual 2-form, and $\omega$ is a real selfdual two form, often taken to be zero or harmonic. The gauge group $\mathcal{G}$ acts on the space of solutions. After adding the gauge fixing condition $d^*A = 0$ the residual U(1) acts freely, except for "reducible solutions" with $\phi = 0$. For technical reasons, the equations are in fact defined in suitable Sobolev spaces of sufficiently high regularity.

An application of the Weitzenböck formula

$${\nabla^A}^* \nabla^A \phi = \left(D^A\right)^2\phi - \left(\tfrac{1}{2} \gamma{\left(F_A^+\right)} + s\right)\phi$$

and the identity

$$\Delta_g \left|\phi\right|_h^2 = 2h{\left({\nabla^A}^* \nabla^A\phi, \phi\right)} - 2\left|\nabla^A\phi\right|_{g\otimes h}$$

to solutions of the equations gives an equality

$$\Delta\left|\phi\right|^2 + \left|\nabla^A\phi\right|^2 + \tfrac{1}{4} \left|\phi\right|^4 = (-s)\left|\phi\right|^2 - \tfrac{1}{2} h(\phi,\gamma(\omega)\phi).$$

If $|\phi|^2$ is maximal $\Delta|\phi|^2\ge 0$, so this shows that for any solution, the sup norm $\|\phi\|_\infty$ is a priori bounded with the bound depending only on the scalar curvature $s$ of $(M, g)$ and the self dual form $\omega$. After adding the gauge fixing condition, elliptic regularity of the Dirac equation shows that solutions are in fact a priori bounded in Sobolev norms of arbitrary regularity, which shows all solutions are smooth, and that the space of all solutions up to gauge equivalence is compact.

The solutions $(\phi,\nabla^A)$ of the Seiberg–Witten equations are called monopoles, as these equations are the field equations of massless magnetic monopoles on the manifold $M$.

== The moduli space of solutions ==
The space of solutions is acted on by the gauge group, and the quotient by this action is called the moduli space of monopoles.

The moduli space is usually a manifold. For generic metrics, after gauge fixing, the equations cut out the solution space transversely and so define a smooth manifold. The residual U(1) "gauge fixed" gauge group U(1) acts freely except at reducible monopoles i.e. solutions with $\phi = 0$. By the Atiyah–Singer index theorem the moduli space is finite dimensional and has "virtual dimension"

$$(K^2-2\chi_{\mathrm{top}}(M)-3\operatorname{sign}(M))/4$$

which for generic metrics is the actual dimension away from the reducibles. It means that the moduli space is generically empty if the virtual dimension is negative.

For a self dual 2 form $\omega$, the reducible solutions have $\phi = 0$, and so are determined by connections $\nabla_A = \nabla_0 + A$ on $L$ such that $F_0 + d A = i(\alpha + \omega)$ for some anti selfdual 2-form $\alpha$. By the Hodge decomposition, since $F_0$ is closed, the only obstruction to solving this equation for $A$ given $\alpha$ and $\omega$, is the harmonic part of $\alpha$ and $\omega$, and the harmonic part, or equivalently, the (de Rham) cohomology class of the curvature form i.e. $[F_0] = F_0^{\mathrm{harm}} = i (\omega^{\mathrm{harm}} + \alpha^{\mathrm{harm}}) \in H^2(M, \R)$. Thus, since the $[\tfrac1{2\pi i} F_0] = K$ the necessary and sufficient condition for a reducible solution is

$$\omega^{\mathrm{harm}} \in 2\pi K + \mathcal{H}^- \in H^2(X,\R)$$

where $\mathcal{H}^-$ is the space of harmonic anti-selfdual 2-forms. A two form $\omega$ is $K$-admissible if this condition is not met and solutions are necessarily irreducible. In particular, for $b^+ \ge 1$, the moduli space is a (possibly empty) compact manifold for generic metrics and admissible $\omega$. Note that, if $b_+ \ge 2$ the space of $K$-admissible two forms is connected, whereas if $b_+ = 1$ it has two connected components (chambers). The moduli space can be given a natural orientation from an orientation on the space of positive harmonic 2 forms, and the first cohomology.

The a priori bound on the solutions, also gives a priori bounds on $F^{\mathrm{harm}}$. There are therefore (for fixed $\omega$) only finitely many $K \in H^2(M,\Z)$, and hence only finitely many Spin^{c} structures, with a non empty moduli space.

== Seiberg–Witten invariants ==
The Seiberg–Witten invariant of a four-manifold M with b_{2}^{+}(M) ≥ 2 is a map from the spin^{c} structures on M to Z. The value of the invariant on a spin^{c} structure is easiest to define when the Seiberg–Witten moduli space is zero-dimensional (for a generic metric). In this case the value is the number of elements of the moduli space counted with signs.

The Seiberg–Witten invariant can also be defined when b_{2}^{+}(M) = 1, but then it depends on the choice of a chamber.

A manifold M is said to be of simple type if the Seiberg–Witten invariant vanishes whenever the expected dimension of the moduli space is nonzero. The simple type conjecture states that if M is simply connected and b_{2}^{+}(M) ≥ 2 then the manifold is of simple type. This is true for symplectic manifolds.

If the manifold M has a metric of positive scalar curvature and b_{2}^{+}(M) ≥ 2 then all Seiberg–Witten invariants of M vanish.

If the manifold M is the connected sum of two manifolds both of which have b_{2}^{+} ≥ 1 then all Seiberg–Witten invariants of M vanish.

If the manifold M is simply connected and symplectic and b_{2}^{+}(M) ≥ 2 then it has a spin^{c} structure s on which the Seiberg–Witten invariant is 1. In particular it cannot be split as a connected sum of manifolds with b_{2}^{+} ≥ 1.

== See also ==
- Seiberg–Witten flow

== Literature ==
- Akbulut, Selman (2016). "Chapter 13: Seiberg-Witten invariants". 4-Manifolds. Oxford Graduate Texts in Mathematics. Vol. 25. Oxford University Press. ISBN 978-0-19-878486-9.
- Donaldson, Simon K. (1996), "The Seiberg-Witten equations and 4-manifold topology.", Bulletin of the American Mathematical Society, (N.S.), 33 (1): 45–70, doi:10.1090/S0273-0979-96-00625-8, MR 1339810
- Jackson, Allyn (1995), A revolution in mathematics, archived from the original on April 26, 2010
- Morgan, John W. (1996), The Seiberg–Witten equations and applications to the topology of smooth four-manifolds, Mathematical Notes, vol. 44, Princeton, NJ: Princeton University Press, pp. viii+128, ISBN 978-0-691-02597-1, MR 1367507
- Moore, John Douglas (2001), Lectures on Seiberg-Witten Invariants, Lecture Notes in Mathematics, vol. 1629 (2nd ed.), Berlin: Springer-Verlag, pp. viii+121, doi:10.1007/BFb0092948, ISBN 978-3-540-41221-2, MR 1830497
- Nash, Ch. (2001) [1994], "Seiberg-Witten equations", Encyclopedia of Mathematics, EMS Press
- Gompf, Robert E.; Stipcisz, András I. (1999). 4-Manifolds and Kirby Calculus. doi:10.1090/gsm/020. ISBN 978-1-4704-7455-3.
- Nicolaescu, Liviu I. (2000), Notes on Seiberg-Witten theory (PDF), Graduate Studies in Mathematics, vol. 28, Providence, RI: American Mathematical Society, pp. xviii+484, doi:10.1090/gsm/028, ISBN 978-0-8218-2145-9, MR 1787219
- Scorpan, Alexandru (2005), The wild world of 4-manifolds, American Mathematical Society, ISBN 978-0-8218-3749-8, MR 2136212.
- Seiberg, Nathan; Witten, Edward (1994a), "Electric-magnetic duality, monopole condensation, and confinement in N=2 supersymmetric Yang-Mills theory", Nuclear Physics B, 426 (1): 19–52, arXiv:hep-th/9407087, Bibcode:1994NuPhB.426...19S, doi:10.1016/0550-3213(94)90124-4, MR 1293681, S2CID 14361074; "Erratum", Nuclear Physics B, 430 (2): 485–486, 1994, Bibcode:1994NuPhB.430..485., doi:10.1016/0550-3213(94)00449-8, MR 1303306
- Seiberg, N.; Witten, E. (1994b), "Monopoles, duality and chiral symmetry breaking in N=2 supersymmetric QCD", Nuclear Physics B, 431 (3): 484–550, arXiv:hep-th/9408099, Bibcode:1994NuPhB.431..484S, doi:10.1016/0550-3213(94)90214-3, MR 1306869, S2CID 17584951
- Taubes, Clifford Henry (2000), Wentworth, Richard (ed.), Seiberg Witten and Gromov invariants for symplectic 4-manifolds, First International Press Lecture Series, vol. 2, Somerville, MA: International Press, pp. vi+401, ISBN 978-1-57146-061-5, MR 1798809
- Witten, Edward (1994), "Monopoles and four-manifolds.", Mathematical Research Letters, 1 (6): 769–796, arXiv:hep-th/9411102, Bibcode:1994MRLet...1..769W, doi:10.4310/MRL.1994.v1.n6.a13, MR 1306021, S2CID 10611124
