= Yang–Mills flow =

Gradient flow of the Yang–Mills action functional

Visualization of gradient descent with one flow line

In differential geometry, the Yang–Mills flow is a gradient flow described by the Yang–Mills equations, hence a method to describe a gradient descent of the Yang–Mills action functional. Simply put, the Yang–Mills flow is a path always going in the direction of steepest descent, similar to the path of a ball rolling down a hill. This helps to find critical points, called Yang–Mills connections or instantons, which solve the Yang–Mills equations, as well as to study their stability. Illustratively, they are the points on the hill on which the ball can rest.

The Yang–Mills flow is named after Yang Chen-Ning and Robert Mills, who formulated the underlying Yang–Mills theory in 1954, although it was first studied by Michael Atiyah and Raoul Bott in 1982. It was also studied by Simon Donaldson in the context of the Kobayashi–Hitchin correspondence (or Donaldson–Uhlenbeck–Yau theorem).

== Definition ==
Let $G$ be a compact Lie group with Lie algebra $\mathfrak{g}$ and $E\twoheadrightarrow B$ be a principal $G$-bundle with a compact orientable Riemannian manifold $B$ having a metric $g$ and a volume form $\operatorname{vol}_g$. Let $\operatorname{Ad}(E) :=E\times_G\mathfrak{g}\twoheadrightarrow B$ be its adjoint bundle. $\mathcal{A} =\Omega_{\operatorname{Ad}}^1(E,\mathfrak{g})$, an affine vector space (not canonically) isomorphic to $\Omega^1(B,\operatorname{Ad}(E))$, is the space of connections. These are under the adjoint representation $\operatorname{Ad}$ invariant $\mathfrak{g}$-valued (Lie algebra–valued) differential forms on $E$ and through pullback along smooth sections $B\hookrightarrow E$ differ by $\operatorname{Ad}(E)$-valued (vector bundle–valued) differential forms on $B$.

All spaces $\Omega^k(B,\operatorname{Ad}(E))$ are vector spaces, which from $B$ together with the choice of an $\operatorname{Ad}$ invariant pairing on $\mathfrak{g}$ (which for semisimple $\mathfrak{g}$ must be proportional to its Killing form) inherit a local pairing $\langle-,-\rangle\colon \Omega^k(B,\operatorname{Ad}(E))\times\Omega^k(B,\operatorname{Ad}(E))\rightarrow C^\infty(B)$. It defines the Hodge star operator by $\langle\omega,\eta\rangle\operatorname{vol}_g =\omega\wedge\star\eta$ for all $\omega,\eta\in\Omega^k(B,\operatorname{Ad}(E))$. Through postcomposition with integration there is furthermore a scalar product $\langle-,-\rangle\colon \Omega^k(B,\operatorname{Ad}(E))\times\Omega^k(B,\operatorname{Ad}(E))\rightarrow\mathbb{R}$. Its induced norm is exactly the $L^2$ norm.

A connection $A\in\mathcal{A} =\Omega_{\operatorname{Ad}}^1(E,\mathfrak{g})$ induces a differential $\mathrm{d}_A\colon \Omega^k(B,\operatorname{Ad}(E))\rightarrow\Omega^{k+1}(B,\operatorname{Ad}(E))$, which has an adjoint codifferential $\delta_A\colon \Omega^{k+1}(B,\operatorname{Ad}(E))\rightarrow\Omega^k(B,\operatorname{Ad}(E))$. Unlike the Cartan differential $\mathrm{d}$ with $\mathrm{d}^2=0$, the differential $\mathrm{d}_A$ fulfills $\mathrm{d}_A^2=[F_A,-]$ with the curvature form:

$$F_A
:=\mathrm{d}A
+\frac{1}{2}[A\wedge A].$$

The Yang–Mills action functional is given by:

$$\operatorname{YM}\colon
\mathcal{A}
=\Omega_{\operatorname{Ad}}^1(E,\mathfrak{g})\rightarrow\mathbb{R},
\operatorname{YM}(A)
:=\int_B\|F_A\|^2\mathrm{d}\operatorname{vol}_g
\geq 0.$$

Hence the gradient of the Yang–Mills action functional gives exactly the Yang–Mills equations:

$$\operatorname{grad}(\operatorname{YM})(A)
=-\delta_AF_A.$$

For an open interval $I\subseteq\mathbb{R}$, a $C^1$ map $\alpha\colon I\rightarrow\mathcal{A} =\Omega_{\operatorname{Ad}}^1(E,\mathfrak{g})$ (hence continuously differentiable) fulfilling:

$$\alpha'(t)
=-\operatorname{grad}(\operatorname{YM})(\alpha(t))
=-\delta_{\alpha(t)}F_{\alpha(t)}$$

is a Yang–Mills flow.

== Properties ==
- For a Yang–Mills connection $A\in\mathcal{A} =\Omega_{\operatorname{Ad}}^1(E,\mathfrak{g})$, the constant path on it is a Yang–Mills flow.
- For a Yang–Mills flow $\alpha\colon I\rightarrow\mathcal{A} =\Omega_{\operatorname{Ad}}^1(E,\mathfrak{g})$ one has:

$$(\operatorname{YM}\circ\alpha)'(t)
=-\int_X\|\alpha'(t)\|^2\mathrm{d}\operatorname{vol}_g
\leq 0.$$

Hence $\operatorname{YM}\circ\alpha\colon I\rightarrow\mathbb{R}$ is a monotonically decreasing function. Alternatively with the above equation, the derivative can be connected to the Bi-Yang–Mills action functional:

$$(\operatorname{YM}\circ\alpha)'(t)
=-\int_X\|\delta_{\alpha(t)}F_{\alpha(t)}\|^2\mathrm{d}\operatorname{vol}_g
=\operatorname{BiYM}(\alpha(t)).$$

Since the Yang–Mills action functional is always positive, a Yang–Mills flow which is continued towards infinity must inevitably converge to a vanishing derivative and hence a Yang–Mills connection according to the above equation.

- For any connection $A\in\mathcal{A} =\Omega_{\operatorname{Ad}}^1(E,\mathfrak{g})$, there is a unique Yang–Mills flow $\alpha\colon [0,\infty)\rightarrow\mathcal{A} =\Omega_{\operatorname{Ad}}^1(E,\mathfrak{g})$ with $\alpha(0)=A$. Then $\lim_{t\rightarrow\infty}\alpha(t)$ is a Yang–Mills connection.
- For a stable Yang–Mills connection $A\in\mathcal{A} =\Omega_{\operatorname{Ad}}^1(E,\mathfrak{g})$, there exists a neighborhood so that every unique Yang–Mills flow $\alpha\colon [0,\infty)\rightarrow\mathcal{A} =\Omega_{\operatorname{Ad}}^1(E,\mathfrak{g})$ with initial condition in it fulfills:
  $$A
=\lim_{t\rightarrow\infty}\alpha(t).$$

== Literature ==
- Donaldson, Simon K.; Kronheimer, Peter B. (1990-09-13). The Geometry of Four-Manifolds. Oxford University Press. doi:10.1093/oso/9780198535539.001.0001. ISBN 978-0-198-53553-9.
- Kelleher, Casey Lynn; Streets, Jeffrey (2016-02-09). "Singularity formation of the Yang-Mills flow". arXiv:1602.03125 [math.DG].
- Alex, Waldron (2016-10-16). "Long-time existence for Yang–Mills flow". Inventiones Mathematicae. 217 (3): 1069–1147. arXiv:1610.03424. doi:10.1007/s00222-019-00877-2.
- Zhang, Pan (2020-03-30). "Gradient Flows of Higher Order Yang-Mills-Higgs Functionals". arXiv:2004.00420 [math.DG].

== See also ==
- Yang–Mills–Higgs flow
- Seiberg–Witten flow
