= Yang–Mills–Higgs flow =

Gradient flow of the Yang–Mills–Higgs action functional

Visualization of gradient descent with one flow line

In differential geometry, the Yang–Mills–Higgs flow is a gradient flow described by the Yang–Mills–Higgs equations, hence a method to describe a gradient descent of the Yang–Mills–Higgs action functional. Simply put, the Yang–Mills–Higgs flow is a path always going in the direction of steepest descent, similar to the path of a ball rolling down a hill. This helps to find critical points, called Yang–Mills–Higgs pairs, which solve the Yang–Mills–Higgs equations, as well as to study their stability. Illustratively, they are the points on the hill on which the ball can rest.

The Yang–Mills–Higgs flow is named after Yang Chen-Ning, Robert Mills and Peter Higgs with the former two having formulated the underlying Yang–Mills theory in 1954 and the latter having proposed the coupling to the Higgs field in 1964.

== Definition ==
Let $G$ be a compact Lie group with Lie algebra $\mathfrak{g}$ and $E\twoheadrightarrow B$ be a principal $G$-bundle with a compact orientable Riemannian manifold $B$ having a metric $g$ and a volume form $\operatorname{vol}_g$. Let $\operatorname{Ad}(E) :=E\times_G\mathfrak{g}\twoheadrightarrow B$ be its adjoint bundle. $\mathcal{A} =\Omega_{\operatorname{Ad}}^1(E,\mathfrak{g})$, an affine vector space (not canonically) isomorphic to $\Omega^1(B,\operatorname{Ad}(E))$, is the space of connections. These are under the adjoint representation $\operatorname{Ad}$ invariant $\mathfrak{g}$-valued (Lie algebra–valued) differential forms on $E$ and through pullback along smooth sections $B\hookrightarrow E$ differ by $\operatorname{Ad}(E)$-valued (vector bundle–valued) differential forms on $B$.

The Yang–Mills–Higgs action functional is given by:

$$\operatorname{YMH}\colon
\Omega_{\operatorname{Ad}}^1(E,\mathfrak{g})\times\Gamma^\infty(B,\operatorname{Ad}(E))\rightarrow\mathbb{R},
\operatorname{YMH}(A,\Phi)
:=\int_B\|F_A\|^2+\|\mathrm{d}_A\Phi\|^2\mathrm{d}\operatorname{vol}_g
\geq 0.$$

Its first term is also called Yang–Mills action.

Hence the gradient of the Yang–Mills–Higgs action functional gives exactly the Yang–Mills–Higgs equations:

$$\operatorname{grad}(\operatorname{YMH})(A,\Phi)_1
=\delta_AF_A
+[\Phi,\mathrm{d}_A\Phi],$$
$$\operatorname{grad}(\operatorname{YMH})(A,\Phi)_2
=\delta_A\mathrm{d}_A\Phi.$$

For an open interval $I\subseteq\mathbb{R}$, two $C^1$ maps $\alpha\colon I\rightarrow\mathcal{A} =\Omega_{\operatorname{Ad}}^1(E,\mathfrak{g})$ and $\varphi\colon I\rightarrow\Gamma^\infty(B,\operatorname{Ad}(E))$ (hence continuously differentiable) fulfilling:

$$\alpha'(t)
=-\operatorname{grad}(\operatorname{YMH})(\alpha(t),\varphi(t))_1
=-\delta_{\alpha(t)}F_{\alpha(t)}
-[\varphi(t),\mathrm{d}_{\alpha(t)}\varphi(t)]$$
$$\varphi'(t)
=-\operatorname{grad}(\operatorname{YMH})(\alpha(t),\varphi(t))_2
=-\delta_{\alpha(t)}\mathrm{d}_{\alpha(t)}\varphi(t)$$

are a Yang–Mills–Higgs flow.

== Properties ==
- For a Yang–Mills–Higgs pair $(A,\Phi)\in\Omega_{\operatorname{Ad}}^1(E,\mathfrak{g})\times\Gamma^\infty(B,\operatorname{Ad}(E))$, the constant path on it is a Yang–Mills–Higgs flow.
- For a Yang–Mills–Higgs flow $(\alpha,\varphi)\colon I\rightarrow\Omega_{\operatorname{Ad}}^1(E,\mathfrak{g})\times\Gamma^\infty(B,\operatorname{Ad}(E))$ one has:

$$(\operatorname{YMH}\circ(\alpha,\varphi))'(t)
=-\int_X\|\alpha'(t)\|^2
+\|\varphi'(t)\|^2\mathrm{d}\operatorname{vol}_g
\leq 0.$$

Hence $\operatorname{YMH}\circ(\alpha,\varphi)\colon I\rightarrow\mathbb{R}$ is a monotonically decreasing function. Since the Yang–Mills–Higgs action functional is always positive, a Yang–Mills–Higgs flow which is continued towards infinity must inevitably converge to vanishing derivatives and hence a Yang–Mills–Higgs pair according to the above equations.

- For any pair $(A,\Phi)\in\Omega_{\operatorname{Ad}}^1(E,\mathfrak{g})\times\Gamma^\infty(B,\operatorname{Ad}(E))$, there is a unique Yang–Mills–Higgs flow $(\alpha,\varphi)\colon [0,\infty)\rightarrow\Omega_{\operatorname{Ad}}^1(E,\mathfrak{g})\times\Gamma^\infty(B,\operatorname{Ad}(E))$ with $(\alpha(0),\varphi(0))=(A,\Phi)$. Then $(\lim_{t\rightarrow\infty}\alpha(t),\lim_{t\rightarrow\infty}\varphi(t))$ is a Yang–Mills–Higgs pair.
- For a stable Yang–Mills–Higgs pair $(A,\Phi)\in\Omega_{\operatorname{Ad}}^1(E,\mathfrak{g})\times\Gamma^\infty(B,\operatorname{Ad}(E))$, there exists a neighborhood so that every unique Yang–Mills–Higgs flow $(\alpha,\varphi)\colon [0,\infty)\rightarrow\Omega_{\operatorname{Ad}}^1(E,\mathfrak{g})\times\Gamma^\infty(B,\operatorname{Ad}(E))$ with initial condition in it fulfills:
  $$A
=\lim_{t\rightarrow\infty}\alpha(t),$$
  $$\Phi
=\lim_{t\rightarrow\infty}\varphi(t).$$

== Ginzburg–Landau flow ==
A generalization of the Yang–Mills–Higgs flow is the Ginzburg–Landau flow, named after Vitaly Ginzburg and Lev Landau, with an additional potential term for the Higgs field.

== Literature ==
- Zhang, Pan (2020-03-30). "Gradient Flows of Higher Order Yang-Mills-Higgs Functionals". arXiv:2004.00420 [math.DG].
- Changpeng Pan, Zhenghan Shen, Pan Zhang (2024). "The Limit of the Yang-Mills-Higgs Flow for twisted Higgs pairs". International Journal of Geometric Methods in Modern Physics. 21 (4) 2450075: 2450075–33. arXiv:2301.02552. Bibcode:2024IJGMM..2150075P. doi:10.1142/S0219887824500750.

== See also ==
- Yang–Mills flow
- Seiberg–Witten flow
