= Stable Yang–Mills connection =

Concept in differential geometry

In differential geometry and especially Yang–Mills theory, a (weakly) stable Yang–Mills (YM) connection is a Yang–Mills connection around which the Yang–Mills action functional is positively or even strictly positively curved. Yang–Mills connections are solutions of the Yang–Mills equations following from them being local extrema of the curvature, hence critical points of the Yang–Mills action functional, which are determined by a vanishing first derivative of a variation. (Weakly) stable Yang–Mills connections furthermore have a positive or even strictly positive curved neighborhood and hence are determined by a positive or even strictly positive second derivative of a variation.

(Weakly) stable Yang–Mills connections are named after Yang Chen-Ning and Robert Mills.

== Definition ==
Let $G$ be a compact Lie group with Lie algebra $\mathfrak{g}$ and $E\twoheadrightarrow B$ be a principal $G$-bundle with a compact orientable Riemannian manifold $B$ having a metric $g$ and a volume form $\operatorname{vol}_g$. Let $\operatorname{Ad}(E) :=E\times_G\mathfrak{g}$ be its adjoint bundle. $\mathcal{A} =\Omega_{\operatorname{Ad}}^1(E,\mathfrak{g})$, an affine vector space (not canonically) isomorphic to $\Omega^1(B,\operatorname{Ad}(E))$, is the space of connections. These are under the adjoint representation $\operatorname{Ad}$ invariant $\mathfrak{g}$-valued (Lie algebra–valued) differential forms on $E$ and through pullback along smooth sections $B\hookrightarrow E$ differ by $\operatorname{Ad}(E)$-valued (vector bundle–valued) differential forms on $B$.

The Yang–Mills action functional is given by:

$$\operatorname{YM}\colon
\mathcal{A}
=\Omega_{\operatorname{Ad}}^1(E,\mathfrak{g})\rightarrow\mathbb{R},
\operatorname{YM}(A)
:=\int_B\|F_A\|^2\mathrm{d}\operatorname{vol}_g.$$

A Yang–Mills connection $A\in\mathcal{A} =\Omega_{\operatorname{Ad}}^1(E,\mathfrak{g})$, hence which fulfills the Yang–Mills equations, is called stable if:

$$\frac{\mathrm{d}^2}{\mathrm{d}t^2}\operatorname{YM}(\alpha(t))\vert_{t=0}>0$$

for every smooth family $\alpha\colon (-\varepsilon,\varepsilon)\rightarrow\mathcal{A} =\Omega_{\operatorname{Ad}}^1(E,\mathfrak{g})$ with $\alpha(0)=A$. It is called weakly stable if only $\geq 0$ holds. A Yang–Mills connection, which is not weakly stable, is called instable. For comparison, the condition to be a Yang–Mills connection is:

$$\frac{\mathrm{d}}{\mathrm{d}t}\operatorname{YM}(\alpha(t))\vert_{t=0}=0.$$

For a (weakly) stable or instable Yang–Mills connection $A\in\mathcal{A} =\Omega_{\operatorname{Ad}}^1(E,\mathfrak{g})$, its curvature $F_A\in\Omega^2(B,\operatorname{Ad}(E))$ is called a (weakly) stable or instable Yang–Mills field.

== Properties ==
- All weakly stable Yang–Mills connections on $S^n$ for $n\geq 5$ are flat. James Simons presented this result without written publication during a symposium on "Minimal Submanifolds and Geodesics" in Tokyo in September 1977.
- If for a compact $n$-dimensional smooth submanifold in $\mathbb{R}^{n+1}$ an $\varepsilon\geq 0$ exists so that:
  $$\frac{2}{n-2}\varepsilon
<\lambda_i
\leq\varepsilon$$

for all principal curvatures $\lambda_1,\ldots,\lambda_n$, then all weakly stable Yang–Mills connections on it are flat. As the inequality shows, the result can only be applied for $n\geq 5$, for which it includes the previous result as a special case.

- Every weakly stable Yang–Mills field over $S^4$ with gauge group $\operatorname{SU}(2)$, $\operatorname{SU}(3)$, or $\operatorname{U}(2)$ is either anti self-dual or self-dual.
- Every weakly stable Yang–Mills field over a compact orientable homogenous Riemannian $4$-manifold with gauge group $\operatorname{SU}(2)$ is either anti self-dual, self-dual or reduces to an abelian field.

== Yang–Mills-instable manifolds ==
A compact Riemannian manifold, for which no principal bundle over it (with a compact Lie group as structure group) has a stable Yang–Mills connection is called Yang–Mills-instable (or YM-instable). For example, the spheres $S^n$ are Yang–Mills-instable for $n\geq 5$ because of the above result from James Simons. A Yang–Mills-instable manifold always has a vanishing second Betti number. Central for the proof is that the infinite complex projective space $\mathbb{C}P^\infty$ is the classifying space $\operatorname{BU}(1)$ as well as the Eilenberg–MacLane space $K(\mathbb{Z},2)$. Hence principal $\operatorname{U}(1)$-bundles over a Yang–Mills-instable manifold $X$ (but even more generally every CW complex) are classified by its second cohomology (with integer coefficients):

$$\operatorname{Prin}_{\operatorname{U}(1)}\left(X\right)
=[X,\operatorname{BU}(1)]
=[X,K(\mathbb{Z},2)]
=H^2(X,\mathbb{Z}).$$

On a non-trivial principal $\operatorname{U}(1)$-bundles over $X$, which exists for a non-trivial second cohomology, one could construct a stable Yang–Mills connection.

Open problems about Yang-Mills-instable manifolds include:

- Is a simply connected compact simple Lie group always Yang-Mills-instable?
- Is a Yang-Mills-instable simply connected compact Riemannian manifold always harmonically instable? Since $S^n\times S^1$ for $n\geq 5$ is Yang-Mills-instable, but not harmonically instable, the condition to be simply connected cannot be dropped.

== Literature ==
- Chiang, Yuan-Jen (2013-06-18). Developments of Harmonic Maps, Wave Maps and Yang-Mills Fields into Biharmonic Maps, Biwave Maps and Bi-Yang-Mills Fields. Frontiers in Mathematics. Birkhäuser. doi:10.1007/978-3-0348-0534-6. ISBN 978-3034805339.

== See also ==
- Stable Yang–Mills–Higgs pair
