= Stable Yang–Mills–Higgs pair =

Concept in differential geometry

In differential geometry and especially Yang–Mills theory, a (weakly) stable Yang–Mills–Higgs (YMH) pair is a Yang–Mills–Higgs pair around which the Yang–Mills–Higgs action functional is positively or even strictly positively curved. Yang–Mills–Higgs pairs are solutions of the Yang–Mills–Higgs equations following from them being local extrema of the curvature of both fields, hence critical points of the Yang–Mills-Higgs action functional, which are determined by a vanishing first derivative of a variation. (Weakly) stable Yang–Mills-Higgs pairs furthermore have a positive or even strictly positive curved neighborhood and hence are determined by a positive or even strictly positive second derivative of a variation.

(Weakly) stable Yang–Mills–Higgs pairs are named after Yang Chen-Ning, Robert Mills and Peter Higgs.

== Definition ==
Let $G$ be a compact Lie group with Lie algebra $\mathfrak{g}$ and $E\twoheadrightarrow B$ be a principal $G$-bundle with a compact orientable Riemannian manifold $B$ having a metric $g$ and a volume form $\operatorname{vol}_g$. Let $\operatorname{Ad}(E) :=E\times_G\mathfrak{g}$ be its adjoint bundle. $\mathcal{A} =\Omega_{\operatorname{Ad}}^1(E,\mathfrak{g})$, an affine vector space (not canonically) isomorphic to $\Omega^1(B,\operatorname{Ad}(E))$, is the space of connections. These are under the adjoint representation $\operatorname{Ad}$ invariant $\mathfrak{g}$-valued (Lie algebra–valued) differential forms on $E$ and through pullback along smooth sections $B\hookrightarrow E$ differ by $\operatorname{Ad}(E)$-valued (vector bundle–valued) differential forms on $B$.

The Yang–Mills–Higgs action functional is given by:

$$\operatorname{YMH}\colon
\Omega_{\operatorname{Ad}}^1(E,\mathfrak{g})\times\Gamma^\infty(B,\operatorname{Ad}(E))\rightarrow\mathbb{R},
\operatorname{YMH}(A,\Phi)
:=\int_B\|F_A\|^2+\|\mathrm{d}_A\Phi\|^2\mathrm{d}\operatorname{vol}_g.$$

A Yang–Mills–Higgs pair $A\in\mathcal{A} =\Omega_{\operatorname{Ad}}^1(E,\mathfrak{g})$ and $\Phi\in\Gamma^\infty(B,\operatorname{Ad}(E))$, hence which fulfill the Yang–Mills–Higgs equations, is called stable if:

$$\frac{\mathrm{d}^2}{\mathrm{d}t^2}\operatorname{YMH}(\alpha(t),\varphi(t))\vert_{t=0}>0$$

for every smooth family $\alpha\colon (-\varepsilon,\varepsilon)\rightarrow\mathcal{A} =\Omega_{\operatorname{Ad}}^1(E,\mathfrak{g})$ with $\alpha(0)=A$ and $\varphi\colon (-\varepsilon,\varepsilon)\rightarrow\Gamma^\infty(B,\operatorname{Ad}(E))$ with $\varphi(0)=\Phi$. It is called weakly stable if only $\geq 0$ holds. A Yang–Mills–Higgs pair, which is not weakly stable, is called instable. For comparison, the condition to be a Yang–Mills–Higgs pair is:

$$\frac{\mathrm{d}}{\mathrm{d}t}\operatorname{YMH}(\alpha(t),\varphi(t))\vert_{t=0}=0.$$

== Properties ==
- Let $(A,\Phi)$ be a weakly stable Yang–Mills–Higgs pair on $S^n$, then the following claims hold:
  - If $n=4$, then $A$ is a Yang–Mills connection ($\mathrm{d}_A\star F_A=0$) as well as $\mathrm{d}_A\Phi=0$ and $\|\Phi\|=1$.
  - If $n\geq 5$, then $A$ is flat ($F_A=0$) as well as $\mathrm{d}_A\Phi=0$ and $\|\Phi\|=1$.

== See also ==
- Stable Yang–Mills connection
