= F-Yang–Mills equations =

In differential geometry, the $F$-Yang–Mills equations (or $F$-YM equations) are a generalization of the Yang–Mills equations. Its solutions are called $F$-Yang–Mills connections (or $F$-YM connections). Simple important cases of $F$-Yang–Mills connections include exponential Yang–Mills connections using the exponential function for $F$ and $p$-Yang–Mills connections using $p$ as exponent of a potence of the norm of the curvature form similar to the $p$-norm. Also often considered are Yang–Mills–Born–Infeld connections (or YMBI connections) with positive or negative sign in a function $F$ involving the square root. This makes the Yang–Mills–Born–Infeld equation similar to the minimal surface equation.

== F-Yang–Mills action functional ==
Let $F\colon\mathbb{R}_0^+\rightarrow\mathbb{R}_0^+$ be a strictly increasing $C^2$ function (hence with $F'>0$) and $F(0)=0$. Let:

$$d_F
:=\sup_{t\geq 0}\frac{tF'(t)}{F(t)}.$$

Since $F$ is a $C^2$ function, one can also consider the following constant:

$$d_{F'}
=\sup_{t\geq 0}\frac{tF''(t)}{F'(t)}.$$

Let $G$ be a compact Lie group with Lie algebra $\mathfrak{g}$ and $E\twoheadrightarrow B$ be a principal $G$-bundle with an orientable Riemannian manifold $B$ having a metric $g$ and a volume form $\operatorname{vol}_g$. Let $\operatorname{Ad}(E) :=E\times_G\mathfrak{g}\twoheadrightarrow B$ be its adjoint bundle. $\Omega_{\operatorname{Ad}}^1(E,\mathfrak{g}) \cong\Omega^1(B,\operatorname{Ad}(E))$ is the space of connections, which are either under the adjoint representation $\operatorname{Ad}$ invariant Lie algebra–valued or vector bundle–valued differential forms. Since the Hodge star operator $\star$ is defined on the base manifold $B$ as it requires the metric $g$ and the volume form $\operatorname{vol}_g$, the second space is usually used.

The $F$-Yang–Mills action functional is given by:

$$\operatorname{YM}_F\colon
\Omega^1(B,\operatorname{Ad}(E))\rightarrow\mathbb{R},\quad
\operatorname{YM}_F(A)
:=\int_BF\left(\frac{1}{2}\|F_A\|^2\right)\mathrm{d}\operatorname{vol}_g.$$

For a flat connection $A\in\Omega^1(B,\operatorname{Ad}(E))$ (with $F_A=0$), one has $\operatorname{YM}_F(A) =F(0)\operatorname{vol}(M)$. Hence $F(0)=0$ is required to avert divergence for a non-compact manifold $B$, although this condition can also be left out as only the derivative $F'$ is of further importance.

== F-Yang–Mills connections and equations ==
A connection $A\in\Omega^1(B,\operatorname{Ad}(E))$ is called $F$-Yang–Mills connection, if it is a critical point of the $F$-Yang–Mills action functional, hence if:

$$\frac{\mathrm{d}}{\mathrm{d}t}\operatorname{YM}_F(A(t))\vert_{t=0}=0$$

for every smooth family $A\colon (-\varepsilon,\varepsilon)\rightarrow\Omega^1(B,\operatorname{Ad}(E))$ with $A(0)=A$. This is the case iff the $F$-Yang–Mills equations are fulfilled:

$$\mathrm{d}_A\star\left(
F'\left(
\frac{1}{2}\|F_A\|^2
\right)F_A
\right)
=0.$$

For a $F$-Yang–Mills connection $A\in\Omega^1(B,\operatorname{Ad}(E))$, its curvature $F_A\in\Omega^2(B,\operatorname{Ad}(E))$ is called $F$-Yang–Mills field.

A $F$-Yang–Mills connection/field with:

- $F(t)=t$ is just an ordinary Yang–Mills connection/field.
- $F(t)=\exp(t)$ (or $F(t)=\exp(t)-1$ for normalization) is called (normed) exponential Yang–Mills connection/field. In this case, one has $d_{F'}=\infty$. The exponential and normed exponential Yang–Mills action functional are denoted with $\operatorname{YM}_\mathrm{e}$ and $\operatorname{YM}_\mathrm{e}^0$ respectively.
- $F(t)=\frac{1}{p}(2t)^{\frac{p}{2}}$ is called $p$-Yang–Mills connection/field. In this case, one has $d_{F'}=\frac{p}{2}-1$. Usual Yang–Mills connections/fields are exactly the $2$-Yang–Mills connections/fields. The $p$-Yang–Mills action functional is denoted with $\operatorname{YM}_p$.
- $F(t)=\sqrt{1-2t}-1$ or $F(t)=\sqrt{1+2t}-1$ is called Yang–Mills–Born–Infeld connection/field (or YMBI connection/field) with negative or positive sign respectively. In these cases, one has $d_{F'}=\infty$ and $d_{F'}=0$ respectively. The Yang–Mills–Born–Infeld action functionals with negative and positive sign are denoted with $\operatorname{YMBI}^-$ and $\operatorname{YMBI}^+$ respectively. The Yang–Mills–Born–Infeld equations with positive sign are related to the minimal surface equation:
  $$\mathrm{d}_A\frac{\star F_A}{\sqrt{1+\|F_A\|^2}}
=0.$$

== Stable F-Yang–Mills connection ==
Analogous to (weakly) stable Yang–Mills connections, one can define (weakly) stable $F$-Yang–Mills connections. A $F$-Yang–Mills connection $A\in\Omega^1(B,\operatorname{Ad}(E))$ is called stable if:

$$\frac{\mathrm{d}^2}{\mathrm{d}t^2}\operatorname{YM}_F(A(t))\vert_{t=0}>0$$

for every smooth family $A\colon (-\varepsilon,\varepsilon)\rightarrow\Omega^1(B,\operatorname{Ad}(E))$ with $A(0)=A$. It is called weakly stable if only $\geq 0$ holds. A $F$-Yang–Mills connection, which is not weakly stable, is called unstable. For a (weakly) stable or unstable $F$-Yang–Mills connection $A\in\Omega^1(B,\operatorname{Ad}(E))$, its curvature $F_A\in\Omega^2(B,\operatorname{Ad}(E))$ is furthermore called a (weakly) stable or unstable $F$-Yang–Mills field.

== Properties ==
- For a Yang–Mills connection with constant curvature, its stability as Yang–Mills connection implies its stability as exponential Yang–Mills connection.
- Every non-flat exponential Yang–Mills connection over $S^n$ with $n\geq 5$ and:
  $$\|F_A\|
\leq\sqrt{\frac{n-4}{2}}$$

is unstable.

- Every non-flat Yang–Mills–Born–Infeld connection with negative sign over $S^n$ with $n\geq 5$ and:
  $$\|F_A\|
\leq\sqrt{\frac{n-4}{n-2}}$$

is unstable.

- All non-flat $F$-Yang–Mills connections over $S^n$ with $n>4(d_{F'}+1)$ are unstable. This result includes the following special cases:
  - All non-flat Yang–Mills connections with positive sign over $S^n$ with $n>4$ are unstable. James Simons presented this result without written publication during a symposium on "Minimal Submanifolds and Geodesics" in Tokyo in September 1977.
  - All non-flat $p$-Yang–Mills connections over $S^n$ with $n>2p$ are unstable.
  - All non-flat Yang–Mills–Born–Infeld connections with positive sign over $S^n$ with $n>4$ are unstable.
- For $0\leq d_{F'}\leq\frac{1}{6}$, every non-flat $F$-Yang–Mills connection over the Cayley plane $F_4/\operatorname{Spin}(9)$ is unstable.

== Literature ==
- Chiang, Yuan-Jen (2013-06-18). Developments of Harmonic Maps, Wave Maps and Yang-Mills Fields into Biharmonic Maps, Biwave Maps and Bi-Yang-Mills Fields. Frontiers in Mathematics. Birkhäuser. doi:10.1007/978-3-0348-0534-6. ISBN 978-3034805339.

== See also ==
- Bi-Yang–Mills equations, modification of the Yang–Mills equation
