= Scalar chromodynamics =

Quantum chromodynamics with scalar matter

In quantum field theory, scalar chromodynamics, also known as scalar quantum chromodynamics or scalar QCD, is a gauge theory consisting of a gauge field coupled to a scalar field. This theory is used experimentally to model the Higgs sector of the Standard Model.

It arises from a coupling of a scalar field to gauge fields. Scalar fields are used to model certain particles in particle physics; the most important example is the Higgs boson. Gauge fields are used to model forces in particle physics: they are force carriers. When applied to the Higgs sector, these are the gauge fields appearing in electroweak theory, described by Glashow–Weinberg–Salam theory.

== Matter content and Lagrangian ==
=== Matter content ===
This article discusses the theory on flat spacetime $\mathbb{R}^{1,3}$, commonly known as Minkowski space.

The model consists of a complex vector valued scalar field $\phi$ minimally coupled to a gauge field $A_\mu$.

The gauge group of the theory is a Lie group $G$. Commonly, this is $\text{SU}(N)$ for some $N$, though many details hold even when we don't concretely fix $G$.

The scalar field can be treated as a function $\phi: \mathbb{R}^{1,3}\rightarrow V$, where $(V, \rho, G)$ is the data of a representation of $G$. Then $V$ is a vector space. The 'scalar' refers to how $\phi$ transforms (trivially) under the action of the Lorentz group, despite $\phi$ being vector valued. For concreteness, the representation is often chosen to be the fundamental representation. For $\text{SU}(N)$, this fundamental representation is $\mathbb{C}^N$. Another common representation is the adjoint representation. In this representation, varying the Lagrangian below to find the equations of motion gives the Yang–Mills–Higgs equation.

Each component of the gauge field is a function $A_\mu: \mathbb{R}^{1,3} \rightarrow \mathfrak{g}$ where $\mathfrak{g}$ is the Lie algebra of $G$ from the Lie group–Lie algebra correspondence. From a geometric point of view, $A_\mu$ are the components of a principal connection under a global choice of trivialization (which can be made due to the theory being on flat spacetime).

=== Lagrangian ===
The Lagrangian density arises from minimally coupling the Klein–Gordon Lagrangian (with a potential) to the Yang–Mills Lagrangian. Here the scalar field $\phi$ is in the fundamental representation of $\text{SU}(N)$:

Scalar QCD Lagrangian density

$\mathcal{L} = -\frac{1}{4} \text{tr}(F_{\mu\nu}F^{\mu\nu}) + (D_\mu \phi)^\dagger D^\mu \phi - V(\phi)$

where

- $F_{\mu\nu}$ is the gauge field strength, defined as $F_{\mu\nu} = \partial_\mu A_\nu - \partial_\nu A_\mu + ig[A_\mu, A_\nu]$. In geometry this is the curvature form.
- $D_\mu \phi$ is the covariant derivative of $\phi$, defined as $D_\mu \phi = \partial_\mu \phi - ig\rho(A_\mu)\phi.$
- $g$ is the coupling constant.
- $V(\phi)$ is the potential.
- $\text{tr}$ is an invariant bilinear form on $\mathfrak{g}$, such as the Killing form. It is a typical abuse of notation to label this $\text{tr}$ as the form often arises as the trace in some representation of $\mathfrak{g}$.

This straightforwardly generalizes to an arbitrary gauge group $G$, where $\phi$ takes values in an arbitrary representation $\rho$ equipped with an invariant inner product $\langle \cdot , \cdot \rangle$, by replacing $(D_\mu \phi)^\dagger D^\mu \phi \mapsto \langle D_\mu \phi, D^\mu \phi \rangle$.

=== Gauge invariance ===
The model is invariant under gauge transformations, which at the group level is a function $U:\mathbb{R}^{1,3}\rightarrow G$, and at the algebra level is a function $\alpha:\mathbb{R}^{1,3}\rightarrow \mathfrak{g}$.

At the group level, the transformations of fields is

$$\phi(x) \mapsto U(x)\phi(x)$$
$$A_\mu(x) \mapsto UA_\mu U^{-1} - \frac{i}{g}(\partial_\mu U) U^{-1}.$$

From the geometric viewpoint, $U(x)$ is a global change of trivialization. This is why it is a misnomer to call gauge symmetry a symmetry: it is really a redundancy in the description of the system.

=== Curved spacetime ===
The theory admits a generalization to a curved spacetime $M$, but this requires more subtle definitions for many objects appearing in the theory. For example, the scalar field must be viewed as a section of an associated vector bundle with fibre $V$. This is still true on flat spacetime, but the flatness of the base space allows the section to be viewed as a function $M \rightarrow V$, which is conceptually simpler.

== Higgs mechanism ==
If the potential is minimized at a non-zero value of $\phi$, this model exhibits the Higgs mechanism. In fact the Higgs boson of the Standard Model is modeled by this theory with the choice $G = \text{SU}(2)$; the Higgs boson is also coupled to electromagnetism.

== Examples ==
By concretely choosing a potential $V$, some familiar theories can be recovered.

Taking $V(\phi) = M^2\phi^\dagger \phi$ gives Yang–Mills minimally coupled to a Klein–Gordon field with mass $M$.

Taking $V(\phi) = \lambda (\phi^\dagger \phi)^2 - \mu_H^2\phi^\dagger \phi$ gives the potential for the Higgs boson in the Standard Model.

== See also ==
- Scalar electrodynamics
- Quantum chromodynamics
