= Yang–Mills–Higgs equations =

Yang–Mills coupled to a Higgs field

In mathematics, the Yang–Mills–Higgs equations are a set of non-linear partial differential equations for a Yang–Mills field, given by a connection, and a Higgs field, given by a section of a vector bundle (specifically, the adjoint bundle). These equations are

$$\begin{align}
D_A*F_A + *[\Phi, D_A\Phi] &= 0, \\
D_A*D_A\Phi &= 0
\end{align}$$

with a boundary condition

$$\lim_{|x|\rightarrow \infty}|\Phi|(x) = 1$$

where

A is a connection on a vector bundle,
D_{A} is the exterior covariant derivative,
F_{A} is the curvature of that connection,
Φ is a section of that vector bundle,
∗ is the Hodge star, and
[·,·] is the natural, graded bracket.

These equations are named after Chen Ning Yang, Robert Mills, and Peter Higgs. They are very closely related to the Ginzburg–Landau equations, when these are expressed in a general geometric setting.

M.V. Goganov and L.V. Kapitanskii have shown that the Cauchy problem for hyperbolic Yang–Mills–Higgs equations in Hamiltonian gauge on 4-dimensional Minkowski space have a unique global solution with no restrictions at the spatial infinity. Furthermore, the solution has the finite propagation speed property.

== Lagrangian ==
The equations arise as the equations of motion of the Lagrangian density

Yang–Mills–Higgs Lagrangian density

$\mathcal{L} = -\frac{1}{4} \left\langle F_{\mu\nu},F^{\mu\nu}\right\rangle + \frac{1}{2}\left\langle D_\mu \phi ,D^\mu \phi\right\rangle - V(\phi)$

where $\langle\cdot,\cdot\rangle$ is an invariant symmetric bilinear form on the adjoint bundle. This is sometimes written as $\text{tr}$ due to the fact that such a form can arise from the trace on $\mathfrak{g}$ under some representation; in particular here we are concerned with the adjoint representation, and the trace on this representation is the Killing form.

For the particular form of the Yang–Mills–Higgs equations given above, the potential $V(\phi)$ is vanishing. Another common choice is $V(\phi) = \frac{1}{2}m^2\langle \phi, \phi\rangle$, corresponding to a massive Higgs field.

This theory is a particular case of scalar chromodynamics where the Higgs field $\phi$ is valued in the adjoint representation as opposed to a general representation.

== See also ==
- Yang–Mills equations
- Stable Yang–Mills–Higgs pair
- Yang–Mills–Higgs flow
- Scalar chromodynamics
