= Bi-Yang–Mills equations =

In differential geometry, the Bi-Yang–Mills equations (or Bi-YM equations) are a modification of the Yang–Mills equations. Its solutions are called Bi-Yang–Mills connections (or Bi-YM connections). Simply put, Bi-Yang–Mills connections are to Yang–Mills connections what they are to flat connections. This stems from the fact, that Yang–Mills connections are not necessarily flat, but are at least a local extremum of curvature, while Bi-Yang–Mills connections are not necessarily Yang–Mills connections, but are at least a local extremum of the left side of the Yang–Mills equations. While Yang–Mills connections can be viewed as a non-linear generalization of harmonic maps, Bi-Yang–Mills connections can be viewed as a non-linear generalization of biharmonic maps.

== Bi-Yang–Mills action functional ==
Let $G$ be a compact Lie group with Lie algebra $\mathfrak{g}$ and $E\twoheadrightarrow B$ be a principal $G$-bundle with a compact orientable Riemannian manifold $B$ having a metric $g$ and a volume form $\operatorname{vol}_g$. Let $\operatorname{Ad}(E) :=E\times_G\mathfrak{g}\twoheadrightarrow B$ be its adjoint bundle. $\Omega_{\operatorname{Ad}}^1(E,\mathfrak{g}) \cong\Omega^1(B,\operatorname{Ad}(E))$ is the space of connections, which are either under the adjoint representation $\operatorname{Ad}$ invariant Lie algebra–valued or vector bundle–valued differential forms. Since the Hodge star operator $\star$ is defined on the base manifold $B$ as it requires the metric $g$ and the volume form $\operatorname{vol}_g$, the second space is usually used.

The Bi-Yang–Mills action functional is given by:

$$\operatorname{BiYM}\colon
\Omega^1(B,\operatorname{Ad}(E))\rightarrow\mathbb{R},
\operatorname{BiYM}_F(A)
:=\int_B\|\delta_AF_A\|^2\mathrm{d}\operatorname{vol}_g.$$

== Bi-Yang–Mills connections and equation ==
A connection $A\in\Omega^1(B,\operatorname{Ad}(E))$ is called Bi-Yang–Mills connection, if it is a critical point of the Bi-Yang–Mills action functional, hence if:

$$\frac{\mathrm{d}}{\mathrm{d}t}\operatorname{BiYM}(A(t))\vert_{t=0}=0$$

for every smooth family $A\colon (-\varepsilon,\varepsilon)\rightarrow\Omega^1(B,\operatorname{Ad}(E))$ with $A(0)=A$. This is the case iff the Bi-Yang–Mills equations are fulfilled:

$$(\delta_A\mathrm{d}_A+\mathcal{R}_A)(\delta_AF_A)
=0.$$

For a Bi-Yang–Mills connection $A\in\Omega^1(B,\operatorname{Ad}(E))$, its curvature $F_A\in\Omega^2(B,\operatorname{Ad}(E))$ is called Bi-Yang–Mills field.

== Stable Bi-Yang–Mills connections ==
Analogous to (weakly) stable Yang–Mills connections, one can define (weakly) stable Bi-Yang–Mills connections. A Bi-Yang–Mills connection $A\in\Omega^1(B,\operatorname{Ad}(E))$ is called stable if:

$$\frac{\mathrm{d}^2}{\mathrm{d}t^2}\operatorname{BiYM}(A(t))\vert_{t=0}>0$$

for every smooth family $A\colon (-\varepsilon,\varepsilon)\rightarrow\Omega^1(B,\operatorname{Ad}(E))$ with $A(0)=A$. It is called weakly stable if only $\geq 0$ holds. A Bi-Yang–Mills connection, which is not weakly stable, is called unstable. For a (weakly) stable or unstable Bi-Yang–Mills connection $A\in\Omega^1(B,\operatorname{Ad}(E))$, its curvature $F_A\in\Omega^2(B,\operatorname{Ad}(E))$ is furthermore called a (weakly) stable or unstable Bi-Yang–Mills field.

== Properties ==
- Yang–Mills connections are weakly stable Bi-Yang–Mills connections.

== See also ==
- F-Yang–Mills equations, generalization of the Yang–Mills equation

== Literature ==
- Chiang, Yuan-Jen (2013-06-18). Developments of Harmonic Maps, Wave Maps and Yang-Mills Fields into Biharmonic Maps, Biwave Maps and Bi-Yang-Mills Fields. Frontiers in Mathematics. Birkhäuser. doi:10.1007/978-3-0348-0534-6. ISBN 978-3034805339.
