= Ronald Shaw (physicist) =

British physicist and mathematician (1929–2016)

- Born: September 5, 1929; Tunstall, Stoke-on-Trent
- Died: 2016 (age 86)
- Education: Trinity College, Cambridge
- Known for: Yang–Mills theory
- Scientific career
- Fields: Theoretical physics

Ronald Shaw was a British physicist and mathematician. He is known for preceding Chen Ning Yang and Robert Mills in the creation of Yang-Mills theory under the supervision of Abdus Salam.

Shaw decided not to publish the theory that he had found in January of 1954, and Yang and Mills would publish their results in October of 1954. Shaw would later add the theory to a single chapter of his thesis in 1956.

== Life ==
Ronald Shaw was born in Tunstall, Staffordshire, on September 5th, 1929. He would begin national service as a dentist in 1947 in Derby and would stop his service in 1949. Shaw would later go on to become a student at Cambridge, sitting the mathematical tripos. After getting his doctorate in 1955, Shaw would become a lecturer at the University of Hull, where he would stay for the rest of his life, becoming a personal chair in the mathematical physics department in 1989, then an emeritus professor in 1995.

Shaw's main focus was on finite geometry, and he remained interested in it up until his passing in 2016.

Abdus Salam would give credit to Shaw for the creation of Yang-Mills theory during his Nobel Prize lecture, calling the theory "Yang-Mills-Shaw gauge theory".
