= Norman Myles Kroll =

American physicist

Norman Myles Kroll (6 April 1922, Tulsa, Oklahoma – 8 August 2004, La Jolla, California) was an American theoretical physicist, known for his pioneering work in QED.

== Life ==
Kroll received in 1942 his bachelor's degree from Columbia University after 2 years of study, having studied from 1938 to 1940 at Rice University in Houston. During WW II he did theoretical radar research (magnetron theory), during 1943–1945, at Columbia under the supervision of Willis Lamb and I. I. Rabi. In 1943 Kroll received his master's degree and in 1948 his PhD from Columbia University with Lamb as thesis advisor.

He collaborated with Lamb on their famous paper "On the Self-Energy of a Bound Electron," which was published in 1949 in the Physical Review and reprinted by Dover Publications in 1959 as part of Selected Papers on Quantum Electrodynamics. Based on Kroll's thesis work, the paper provided the first theoretical explanation of the Lamb shift in QED and became one of the most important landmarks of the field.

In the academic year 1948–1949 he was a visiting scholar at the Institute for Advanced Study, where he, with Robert Karplus, calculated the QED two-loop contributions for the anomalous magnetic moment of the electron. Kroll was, with Lamb, one of the first (including Victor Weisskopf and his student Bruce French) to calculate the relativistic Lamb shift (after Hans Bethe made a rough, non-relativistic estimate for it). This work was part of the pioneering efforts that led to the QED formalism developed by Richard Feynman, Julian Schwinger, and Sin-Itiro Tomonaga.

Kroll became at Columbia an assistant professor in 1949 and was promoted to associate professor and then full professor before leaving for UCSD.

In 1962, UCSD recruited Kroll to become one of its physics department's founding members and thereby bring to UCSD the prestige and recognition of a world leader in research. During his four decades at UCSD, Kroll continued his research in QED, developed with Marshall Rosenbluth a theory of the free electron laser, and participated in the design of particle accelerators. In addition, he made numerous contributions to the development of UCSD as one of the nation's leading research universities and twice served as chair of UCSD's physics department, from 1963 to 1965 and from 1983 to 1988.

In 1960–1981 he was a member of the JASON Defense Advisory Group.

Among his doctoral students are Robert Mills and Eyvind Wichmann.

Upon his death, Kroll was survived by his wife, four children, and nine grandchildren.

== Honors ==
In the academic year 1955–1956 he was a Sloan Fellow and a Guggenheim Fellow at the University of Rome. He was elected in 1974 to the National Academy of Sciences. He was a Fellow of the American Academy of Arts and Sciences and a Fellow of the American Physical Society.

== Selected publications ==
- with Lamb: Kroll, Norman M.; Lamb, Willis E. (1949). "On the self-energy of the bound electron". Physical Review. 75 (3): 388–398. Bibcode:1949PhRv...75..388K. doi:10.1103/PhysRev.75.388.
- with Karplus: Karplus, Robert; Kroll, Norman M. (1950). "Fourth-order corrections in quantum electrodynamics and the magnetic moment of the electron". Physical Review. 77 (4): 536–549. Bibcode:1950PhRv...77..536K. doi:10.1103/PhysRev.77.536.
- with Malvin A. Ruderman: Kroll, Norman M.; Ruderman, Malvin A. (1954). "A Theorem on photomeson production near threshold and the suppression of pairs in pseudoscalar meson theory". Physical Review. 93 (1): 233–238. Bibcode:1954PhRv...93..233K. doi:10.1103/PhysRev.93.233.
- with Walter Wada: Kroll, Norman M.; Wada, Walter (1955). "Internal pair production associated with the emission of high-energy gamma rays". Physical Review. 98 (5): 1355–1359. Bibcode:1955PhRv...98.1355K. doi:10.1103/PhysRev.98.1355.
- with Eyvind H. Wichmann: Wichmann, Eyvind H.; Kroll, Norman M. (1956). "Vacuum polarization in a strong coulomb field". Physical Review. 101 (2): 843–859. Bibcode:1956PhRv..101..843W. doi:10.1103/PhysRev.101.843.
- Kroll, Norman M. (1965). "Excitation of Hypersonic Vibrations by Means of Photoelastic Coupling of High-Intensity Light Waves to Elastic Waves". Journal of Applied Physics. 36 (1): 34–43. Bibcode:1965JAP....36...34K. doi:10.1063/1.1713918.
- with Tsung-Dao Lee and Bruno Zumino: Kroll, Norman M.; Lee, T. D.; Zumino, Bruno (1967). "Neutral vector mesons and the hadronic electromagnetic current". Physical Review. 157 (5): 1376–1399. Bibcode:1967PhRv..157.1376K. doi:10.1103/PhysRev.157.1376. ISBN 9780817633424.
- with Kenneth M. Watson: Kroll, Norman M.; Watson, Kenneth M. (1973). "Charged-particle scattering in the presence of a strong electromagnetic wave" (PDF). Physical Review A. 8 (2): 804–809. Bibcode:1973PhRvA...8..804K. doi:10.1103/PhysRevA.8.804. S2CID 121322367.
- with Marvin Douglas: Douglas, Marvin; Kroll, Norman M. (1974). "Quantum electrodynamical corrections to the fine structure of helium". Annals of Physics. 82 (1): 89–155. Bibcode:1974AnPhy..82...89D. doi:10.1016/0003-4916(74)90333-9.
- with Philip L. Morton and Marshall N. Rosenbluth: Kroll, N.; Morton, P.; Rosenbluth, M. (1981). "Free-electron lasers with variable parameter wigglers" (PDF). IEEE Journal of Quantum Electronics. 17 (8): 1436–1468. Bibcode:1981IJQE...17.1436K. doi:10.1109/JQE.1981.1071285. S2CID 1089168. Archived from the original on September 25, 2017.
