= Yang–Mills theory =

Quantum field theory

Unsolved problem in physics
Yang–Mills theory and the mass gap. Quantum particles described by the theory have mass but the classical waves of the field travel at the speed of light and therefore its particles must be massless
More unsolved problems in physics

Yang–Mills theory is a quantum field theory for nuclear binding devised by Chen Ning Yang and Robert Mills in 1953, as well as a generic term for the class of similar theories. The Yang–Mills theory is a gauge theory based on a special unitary group SU(n), or more generally any compact Lie group. A Yang–Mills theory seeks to describe the behavior of elementary particles using these non-abelian Lie groups and is at the core of the unification of the electromagnetic force and weak forces (i.e. U(1) × SU(2)) as well as quantum chromodynamics, the theory of the strong force (based on SU(3)). Thus it forms the basis of the understanding of the Standard Model of particle physics.

== History ==
=== Gauge theory origins ===
All known fundamental interactions can be described in terms of gauge theories, but working this out took decades. Hermann Weyl's pioneering work on this project started in 1915 when his colleague Emmy Noether proved that every conserved physical quantity has a matching symmetry, and culminated in 1928 when he published his book applying the geometrical theory of symmetry (group theory) to quantum mechanics. Weyl named the relevant symmetry in Noether's theorem the "gauge symmetry", by analogy to distance standardization in railroad gauges.

Erwin Schrödinger in 1922, three years before working on his equation, connected Weyl's group concept to electron charge. Schrödinger showed that the group $\mathrm{U}(1)$ produced a phase shift $e^{i\theta}$ in electromagnetic fields that matched the conservation of electric charge. As the theory of quantum electrodynamics developed in the 1930s and 1940s the $\mathrm{U}(1)$ group transformations played a central role. Many physicists thought there must be an analog for the dynamics of nucleons. Chen Ning Yang in particular was interested in this possibility.

=== Yang and Mills find the nuclear force gauge theory ===
Yang's core idea was to look for a conserved quantity in nuclear physics comparable to electric charge and use it to develop a corresponding gauge theory comparable to electrodynamics. He settled on conservation of isospin, a quantum number that distinguishes a neutron from a proton, but he made no progress on a theory. Taking a break from Princeton in the summer of 1953, Yang met a collaborator who could help: Robert Mills. As Mills himself describes:

"During the academic year 1953–1954, Yang was a visitor to Brookhaven National Laboratory ... I was at Brookhaven also ... and was assigned to the same office as Yang. Yang, who has demonstrated on a number of occasions his generosity to physicists beginning their careers, told me about his idea of generalizing gauge invariance and we discussed it at some length ... I was able to contribute something to the discussions, especially with regard to the quantization procedures, and to a small degree in working out the formalism; however, the key ideas were Yang's."

In the summer of 1953, Yang and Mills extended the concept of gauge theory for abelian groups, e.g. quantum electrodynamics, to non-abelian groups, selecting the group SU(2) to provide an explanation for isospin conservation in collisions involving the strong interactions. Yang's presentation of the work at Princeton in February 1954 was challenged by Pauli, asking about the mass in the field developed with the gauge invariance idea. Pauli knew that this might be an issue as he had worked on applying gauge invariance but chose not to publish it, viewing the massless excitations of the theory to be "unphysical 'shadow particles'". Yang and Mills published in October 1954; near the end of the paper, they admit:

We next come to the question of the mass of the $b$ quantum, to which we do not have a satisfactory answer.

This problem of unphysical massless excitation blocked further progress.

The idea was set aside until 1960, when the concept of particles acquiring mass through symmetry breaking in massless theories was put forward, initially by Jeffrey Goldstone, Yoichiro Nambu, and Giovanni Jona-Lasinio. This prompted a significant restart of Yang–Mills theory studies that proved successful in the formulation of both electroweak unification and quantum chromodynamics (QCD). The electroweak interaction is described by the gauge group SU(2) × U(1), while QCD is an SU(3) Yang–Mills theory. The massless gauge bosons of the electroweak SU(2) × U(1) mix after spontaneous symmetry breaking to produce the three massive bosons of the weak interaction (W^{+}, W^{−}, and Z^{0}) as well as the still-massless photon field. The dynamics of the photon field and its interactions with matter are, in turn, governed by the U(1) gauge theory of quantum electrodynamics. The Standard Model combines the strong interaction with the unified electroweak interaction (unifying the weak and electromagnetic interaction) through the symmetry group SU(3) × SU(2) × U(1). In the current epoch the strong interaction is not unified with the electroweak interaction, but from the observed running of the coupling constants it is believed they all converge to a single value at very high energies.

Phenomenology at lower energies in quantum chromodynamics is not completely understood due to the difficulties of managing such a theory with a strong coupling. This may be the reason why confinement has not been theoretically proven, though it is a consistent experimental observation. This shows why QCD confinement at low energy is a mathematical problem of great relevance, and why the Yang–Mills existence and mass gap problem is a Millennium Prize Problem.

=== Parallel work on non-Abelian gauge theories ===
In 1953, in a private correspondence, Wolfgang Pauli formulated a six-dimensional theory of Einstein's field equations of general relativity, extending the five-dimensional theory of Theodor Kaluza, Oskar Klein, Vladimir Fock, and others to a higher-dimensional internal space. However, there is no evidence that Pauli developed the Lagrangian of a gauge field or the quantization of it. Because Pauli found that his theory "leads to some rather unphysical shadow particles", he refrained from publishing his results formally. Although Pauli did not publish his six-dimensional theory, he gave two seminar lectures about it in Zürich in November 1953.

In January 1954 Ronald Shaw, a graduate student at the University of Cambridge also developed a non-Abelian gauge theory for nuclear forces. However, the theory needed massless particles in order to maintain gauge invariance. Since no such massless particles were known at the time, Shaw and his supervisor Abdus Salam chose not to publish their work. Shortly after Yang and Mills published their paper in October 1954, Salam encouraged Shaw to publish his work to mark his contribution. Shaw declined, and instead it only forms a chapter of his PhD thesis published in 1956.

=== Role in quark theory ===
Yang–Mills theories were met with general acceptance in the physics community after Gerard 't Hooft, in 1972, worked out their renormalization, relying on a formulation of the problem worked out by his advisor Martinus Veltman.

In 1973 David Gross and coworkers attempted to prove that no renormalizable field theory would be asymptotically free and thus could not be used to explain the experimental results of deep inelastic scattering. After proving that for abelian theories, they moved on to Yang–Mills theory. Here they were surprised to discovered that Yang–Mills theory has asymptotic freedom. Rather than excluding field theories, non-abelian field theories like Yang-Mills suddenly became viable ways to model quark behavior.

=== Yang-Mills existence proof ===
In 2006, Arthur Jaffe and Edward Witten formulated the Yang–Mills Existence and Mass Gap problem for Clay Mathematics Institute's list of "Millennium Prize Problems". The problem includes a proof of the conjecture that the lowest excitations of a pure Yang–Mills theory (i.e. without matter fields) have a finite mass-gap with regard to the vacuum state. In 2026, OpenAI discovered a natural language proof of this pure Yang-Mills existence problem. The whole Lean-generated proof and a statement about its validation were released by an independent team led by David Gross

== Mathematical overview ==
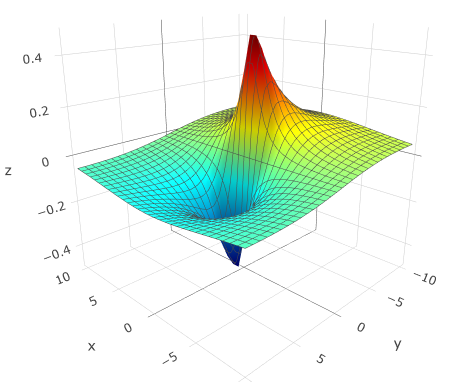
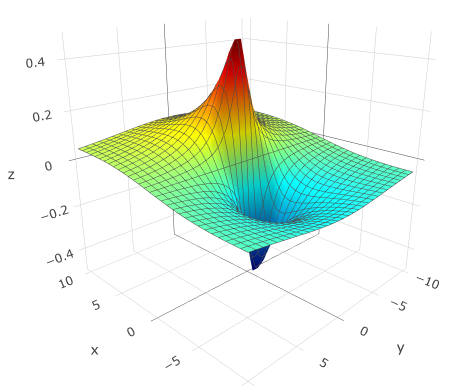
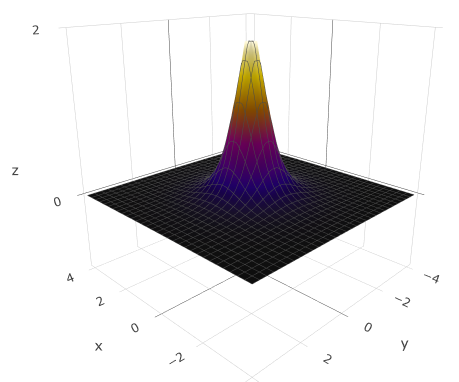
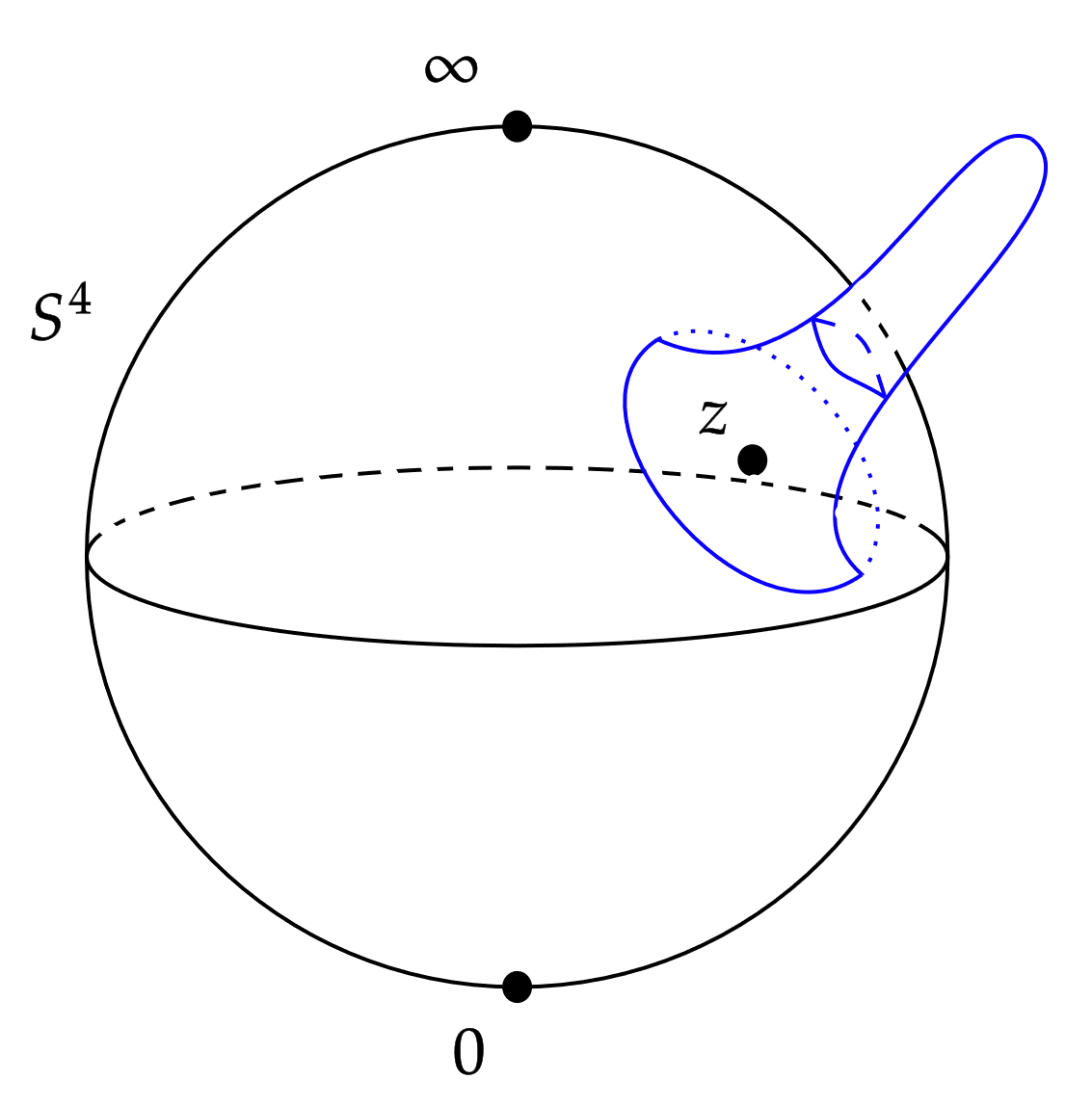
The dx^{1}⊗σ_{3} coefficient of a BPST instanton on the (x^{1},x^{2})-slice of ℝ^{4} where σ_{3} is the third Pauli matrix (top left). The dx^{2}⊗σ_{3} coefficient (top right). These coefficients determine the restriction of the BPST instanton A with g=2, ρ=1, z=0 to this slice. The corresponding field strength centered around z=0 (bottom left). A visual representation of the field strength of a BPST instanton with center z on the compactification S^{4} of ℝ^{4} (bottom right). The BPST instanton is a classical instanton solution to the Yang–Mills equations on ℝ^{4}.

Yang–Mills theories are special examples of gauge theories with a non-abelian symmetry group given by the Lagrangian

$$\ \mathcal{L}_\mathrm{gf} = -\tfrac{1}{2}\operatorname{tr}(F^2) = - \tfrac{1}{4} F^{a\mu \nu} F_{\mu \nu}^a\$$

with the generators $\ T^a\$ of the Lie algebra, indexed by a, corresponding to the F-quantities (the curvature or field-strength form) satisfying

$$\ \operatorname{tr}\left( T^a\ T^b \right) = \tfrac{1}{2} \delta^{ab}\ , \qquad \left[ T^a,\ T^b \right] = i\ f^{abc}\ T^c ~.$$

Here, the f ^{abc} are structure constants of the Lie algebra (totally antisymmetric if the generators of the Lie algebra are normalised such that $\ \operatorname{tr}(T^a\ T^b)\$ is proportional to $\ \delta^{ab}\$), the covariant derivative is defined as

$$\ D_\mu = I\ \partial_\mu - i\ g\ T^a\ A^a_\mu\ ,$$

I is the identity matrix (matching the size of the generators), $\ A^a_\mu\$ is the vector potential, and g is the coupling constant. In four dimensions, the coupling constant g is a pure number and for a SU(n) group one has $\ a, b, c = 1 \ldots n^2-1 ~.$

The relation

$$\ F_{\mu \nu}^a = \partial_\mu A_\nu^a - \partial_\nu A_\mu^a + g\ f^{abc}\ A_\mu^b\ A_\nu^c\$$

can be derived by the commutator

$$\ \left[ D_\mu, D_\nu \right] = -i\ g\ T^a\ F_{\mu\nu}^a ~.$$

The field has the property of being self-interacting and the equations of motion that one obtains are said to be semilinear, as nonlinearities are both with and without derivatives. This means that one can manage this theory only by perturbation theory with small nonlinearities.

Note that the transition between "upper" ("contravariant") and "lower" ("covariant") vector or tensor components is trivial for a indices (e.g. $\ f^{abc} = f_{abc}\$), whereas for μ and ν it is nontrivial, corresponding e.g. to the usual Lorentz signature, $\ \eta_{\mu \nu } = {\rm diag}(+---) ~.$

From the given Lagrangian one can derive the equations of motion given by

$$\ \partial^\mu F_{\mu\nu}^a + g\ f^{abc}\ A^{\mu b}\ F_{\mu\nu}^c = 0 ~.$$

Putting $\ F_{\mu\nu}=T^aF^a_{\mu\nu}\ ,$ these can be rewritten as

$$\ \left( D^\mu F_{\mu\nu} \right)^a = 0 ~.$$

A Bianchi identity holds

$$\ \left( D_\mu\ F_{\nu \kappa} \right)^a + \left( D_\kappa\ F_{\mu \nu} \right)^a + \left( D_\nu\ F_{\kappa \mu} \right)^a = 0\$$

which is equivalent to the Jacobi identity

$$\ \left[ D_{\mu}, \left[ D_{\nu},D_{\kappa} \right] \right] + \left[ D_{\kappa}, \left[ D_{\mu},D_{\nu} \right] \right] + \left[ D_{\nu}, \left[ D_{\kappa},D_{\mu} \right] \right] = 0\$$

since $\ \left[ D_{\mu},F^a_{\nu\kappa} \right] = D_{\mu}\ F^a_{\nu\kappa} ~.$ Define the dual strength tensor $\ \tilde{F}^{\mu\nu} = \tfrac{1}{2}\varepsilon^{\mu\nu\rho\sigma}F_{\rho\sigma}\ ,$ then the Bianchi identity can be rewritten as

$$\ D_{\mu}\tilde{F}^{\mu\nu} = 0 ~.$$

A source $\ J_\mu^a\$ enters into the equations of motion as

$$\ \partial^\mu F_{\mu\nu}^a + g\ f^{abc}\ A^{b\mu}\ F_{\mu\nu}^c = -J_\nu^a ~.$$

The currents must change properly under gauge group transformations.

In D dimensions, the field scales as $\ \left[A\right]=\left[ L^{\left(\tfrac{2-D}{2}\right)} \right]\$ and so the coupling must scale as $\ \left[g^2\right] = \left[L^{\left(D-4\right)}\right] ~.$ This implies that Yang–Mills theory is not renormalizable for dimensions greater than four. Furthermore, for D = 4 , the coupling is dimensionless and both the field and the square of the coupling have the same dimensions of the field and the coupling of a massless quartic scalar field theory. Thus these theories share scale invariance at the classical level.

== Quantization ==
The Yang–Mills theory may be quantized by functional methods, the path integral formulation. A generating functional for n-point functions is introduced as

$$\ Z[j] = \int [\mathrm{d}A]\ \exp\left[- \tfrac{i}{2} \int \mathrm{d}^4x\ \operatorname{tr}\left( F^{\mu \nu}\ F_{\mu \nu}\right) + i\ \int \mathrm{d}^4x\ j^a_\mu(x)\ A^{a\mu}(x) \right]\ ,$$

but this integral has no meaning as it is, because the potential vector can be arbitrarily chosen because of gauge freedom. This problem was already known for quantum electrodynamics, but here becomes more severe due to the non-abelian properties of the gauge group. A way out was suggested by Ludvig Faddeev and Victor Popov with the introduction of a ghost field (see Faddeev–Popov ghost) that has the property of being unphysical since, although it agrees with Fermi–Dirac statistics, it is a complex scalar field, which violates the spin–statistics theorem. So, the generating functional can be written as

$$\begin{align}
Z[j,\bar\varepsilon,\varepsilon] & = \int [\mathrm{d}\ A] [\mathrm{d}\ \bar c] [\mathrm{d}\ c]\ \exp\Bigl\{ i\ S_F\ \left[\partial A, A\right] + i\ S_{gf}\left[\partial A\right] + i\ S_g\left[\partial c, \partial\bar c, c,\bar c, A \right] \Bigr\} \\
&\exp\left\{i\int \mathrm{d}^4x\ j^a_\mu(x)A^{a\mu}(x)+i\int \mathrm{d}^4x\ \left[\bar c^a(x)\ \varepsilon^a(x) + \bar\varepsilon^a(x)\ c^a(x)\right]\right\}
\end{align}$$

being

$$S_F=- \tfrac{1}{2} \int \mathrm{d}^4 x\ \operatorname{tr}\left( F^{\mu \nu}\ F_{\mu \nu} \right)\$$

for the field,

$$S_{gf} = -\frac{1}{2\xi} \int \mathrm{d}^4 x\ (\partial\cdot A)^2\$$

for the gauge fixing and

$$\ S_g = -\int \mathrm{d}^4 x\ \left(\bar c^a\ \partial_\mu\partial^\mu c^a + g\ \bar c^a\ f^{abc}\ \partial_\mu\ A^{b\mu}\ c^c \right)\$$

for the ghost. This is the expression commonly used to derive Feynman's rules (see Feynman diagram). Here we have c^{a} for the ghost field while ξ fixes the gauge's choice for the quantization. The Feynman rules obtained from this functional are

| Diagram | Momentum-space Feynman rule |
|---|---|
| gluon propagator Gluon propagator | $D_{\mu\nu}^{ab}(k) = \frac{-i\,\delta^{ab}}{k^2+i\epsilon} \left( g_{\mu\nu}-(1-\xi)\frac{k_\mu k_\nu}{k^2} \right)$ |
| Three-gluon vertex 3-gluon vertex | $V_{\mu\nu\rho}^{abc}(p,q,r) = g\,f^{abc} \Big[ g_{\mu\nu}(p-q)_\rho + g_{\nu\rho}(q-r)_\mu + g_{\rho\mu}(r-p)_\nu \Big], \qquad p+q+r=0$ |
| Four-gluon vertex 4-gluon vertex | $$\begin{aligned} V_{\mu\nu\rho\sigma}^{abcd} &= - i g^2 \Big[ f^{abe}f^{cde}\,(g_{\mu\rho}g_{\nu\sigma}-g_{\mu\sigma}g_{\nu\rho}) \\ &\quad + f^{ace}f^{bde}\,(g_{\mu\nu}g_{\rho\sigma}-g_{\mu\sigma}g_{\nu\rho}) \\ &\quad + f^{ade}f^{bce}\,(g_{\mu\nu}g_{\rho\sigma}-g_{\mu\rho}g_{\nu\sigma}) \Big] \end{aligned}$$ |
| ghost propagator Ghost propagator | $D_{\mathrm{gh}}^{ab}(k) = \frac{i\,\delta^{ab}}{k^2+i\epsilon}$ |
| Ghost-ghost gluon Ghost—ghost—gluon (ccg) vertex | $V_{\mu}^{abc}(\bar c^a(p),\,c^b(q),\,A_\mu^c(r)) = -\,g\,f^{abc}\,p_\mu, \qquad p+q+r=0$ |

These rules for Feynman diagrams can be obtained when the generating functional given above is rewritten as

$$\begin{align}
Z[j,\bar\varepsilon,\varepsilon] &= \exp\left(-i\ g\int \mathrm{d}^4x\ \frac{\delta}{i\ \delta\ \bar\varepsilon^a(x)}\ f^{abc}\partial_\mu\ \frac{i\ \delta}{\delta\ j^b_\mu(x)}\ \frac{i\ \delta}{\delta\ \varepsilon^c(x)} \right)\\
& \qquad \times \exp\left(-i\ g\int \mathrm{d}^4x\ f^{abc}\partial_\mu\frac{i\ \delta}{\delta\ j^a_\nu(x)}\frac{i\ \delta}{\delta\ j^b_\mu(x)}\ \frac{i\ \delta}{\delta\ j^{c\nu}(x)}\right)\\
& \qquad \qquad \times \exp\left(-i\ \frac{g^2}{4}\int \mathrm{d}^4x\ f^{abc}\ f^{ars}\frac{i\ \delta}{\delta\ j^b_\mu(x)}\ \frac{i\ \delta}{\delta\ j^c_\nu(x)}\ \frac{\ i\delta}{\delta\ j^{r\mu}(x)} \frac{i\ \delta}{\delta\ j^{s\nu}(x)} \right) \\
& \qquad \qquad \qquad \times Z_0[j,\bar\varepsilon,\varepsilon]
\end{align}$$

with

$$Z_0[j,\bar\varepsilon,\varepsilon] = \exp \left( -\int \mathrm{d}^4x\ \mathrm{d}^4y\ \bar\varepsilon^a(x)\ C^{ab}(x-y)\ \varepsilon^b(y) \right)\exp \left( \tfrac{1}{2} \int \mathrm{d}^4x\ \mathrm{d}^4y\ j^a_\mu(x)\ D^{ab\mu\nu}(x-y)\ j^b_\nu(y) \right)\$$

being the generating functional of the free theory. Expanding in g and computing the functional derivatives, we are able to obtain all the n-point functions with perturbation theory. Using LSZ reduction formula we get from the n-point functions the corresponding process amplitudes, cross sections and decay rates. The theory is renormalizable and corrections are finite at any order of perturbation theory.

For quantum electrodynamics the ghost field decouples because the gauge group is abelian. This can be seen from the coupling between the gauge field and the ghost field that is $\ \bar c^a\ f^{abc}\ \partial_\mu A^{b\mu}\ c^c ~.$ For the abelian case, all the structure constants $\ f^{abc}\$ are zero, and so there is no coupling. In the non-abelian case, the ghost field appears as a useful way to rewrite the quantum field theory without physical consequences on the observables of the theory such as cross sections or decay rates.

To obtain the behavior of the Yang–Mills theory at high energies, and so to prove asymptotic freedom, one applies perturbation theory assuming a small coupling. This is verified a posteriori in the ultraviolet limit. In the opposite limit, the infrared limit, the situation is the opposite, as the coupling is too large for perturbation theory to be reliable. The difficulty then encountered is managing the theory at low energies inherent to the description of hadronic matter, the observed bound states of gluons and quarks and their confinement.

The most used method to study the theory in this limit is lattice gauge theory, an attempt to solve it numerically. In this case, large computational resources are needed to be sure the correct limit of infinite volume (smaller lattice spacing) is obtained. This is the limit the results must be compared with. Smaller spacing and larger coupling are not independent of each other, and larger computational resources are needed for each. As of today, the situation appears somewhat satisfactory for the hadronic spectrum and the computation of the gluon and ghost propagators, but the glueball and hybrids spectra are yet a questioned matter in view of the experimental observation of such exotic states. Indeed, the σ resonance is not seen in lattice computations, and contrasting interpretations have been put forward. This is a hotly debated issue.

== Open problems ==
The mathematics of the Yang–Mills theory is a very active field of research, yielding e.g. invariants of differentiable structures on four-dimensional manifolds via work of Simon Donaldson. One open problem is a proof of the confinement property in the presence of additional fermions.

In physics the survey of Yang–Mills theories does not usually start from perturbation analysis or analytical methods, but more recently from systematic application of numerical methods to lattice gauge theories.

== See also ==
- Aharonov–Bohm effect
- Coulomb gauge
- Deformed Hermitian Yang–Mills equations
- Field theoretical formulation of the standard model
- Gauge covariant derivative
- Gauge theory (mathematics)
- Hermitian Yang–Mills equations
- Kaluza–Klein theory
- Lattice gauge theory
- Lorenz gauge
- n = 4 supersymmetric Yang–Mills theory
- Propagator
- Quantum gauge theory
- Symmetry in physics
- Two-dimensional Yang–Mills theory
- Weyl gauge
- Yang–Mills equations
- F-Yang–Mills equations
- Bi-Yang–Mills equations
- Yang–Mills existence and mass gap
- Yang–Mills–Higgs equations
