= Lie algebra–valued differential form =

In differential geometry, a Lie-algebra-valued form is a differential form with values in a Lie algebra. Such forms have important applications in the theory of connections on a principal bundle as well as in the theory of Cartan connections.

== Formal definition ==
A Lie-algebra-valued differential $k$-form on a manifold, $M$, is a smooth section of the bundle $(\mathfrak{g} \times M) \otimes \wedge^k T^*M$, where $\mathfrak{g}$ is a Lie algebra, $T^*M$ is the cotangent bundle of $M$ and $\wedge^k$ denotes the $k^{\text{th}}$ exterior power.

== Wedge product ==
The wedge product of ordinary, real-valued differential forms is defined using multiplication of real numbers. For a pair of Lie algebra–valued differential forms, the wedge product can be defined similarly, but substituting the bilinear Lie bracket operation, to obtain another Lie algebra–valued form. For a $\mathfrak{g}$-valued $p$-form $\omega$ and a $\mathfrak{g}$-valued $q$-form $\eta$, their wedge product $[\omega\wedge\eta]$ is given by

$$[\omega\wedge\eta](v_1, \dotsc, v_{p+q}) = {1 \over p!q!}\sum_{\sigma} \operatorname{sgn}(\sigma) [\omega(v_{\sigma(1)}, \dotsc, v_{\sigma(p)}), \eta(v_{\sigma(p+1)}, \dotsc, v_{\sigma(p+q)})],$$

where the $v_i$'s are tangent vectors. The notation is meant to indicate both operations involved. For example, if $\omega$ and $\eta$ are Lie-algebra-valued one forms, then one has

$$[\omega\wedge\eta](v_1,v_2) = [\omega(v_1), \eta(v_2)] - [\omega(v_2),\eta(v_1)].$$

The operation $[\omega\wedge\eta]$ can also be defined as the bilinear operation on $\Omega(M, \mathfrak{g})$ satisfying

$$[(g \otimes \alpha) \wedge (h \otimes \beta)] = [g, h] \otimes (\alpha \wedge \beta)$$

for all $g, h \in \mathfrak{g}$ and $\alpha, \beta \in \Omega(M, \mathbb R)$.

Some authors have used the notation $[\omega, \eta]$ instead of $[\omega\wedge\eta]$. The notation $[\omega, \eta]$, which resembles a commutator, is justified by the fact that if the Lie algebra $\mathfrak g$ is a matrix algebra then $[\omega\wedge\eta]$ is nothing but the graded commutator of $\omega$ and $\eta$, i. e. if $\omega \in \Omega^p(M, \mathfrak g)$ and $\eta \in \Omega^q(M, \mathfrak g)$ then

$$[\omega\wedge\eta] = \omega\wedge\eta - (-1)^{pq}\eta\wedge\omega,$$

where $\omega \wedge \eta,\ \eta \wedge \omega \in \Omega^{p+q}(M, \mathfrak g)$ are wedge products formed using the matrix multiplication on $\mathfrak g$.

== Operations ==
Let $f : \mathfrak{g} \to \mathfrak{h}$ be a Lie algebra homomorphism. If $\varphi$ is a $\mathfrak{g}$-valued form on a manifold, then $f(\varphi)$ is an $\mathfrak{h}$-valued form on the same manifold obtained by applying $f$ to the values of $\varphi$: $f(\varphi)(v_1, \dotsc, v_k) = f(\varphi(v_1, \dotsc, v_k))$.

Similarly, if $f$ is a multilinear functional on $\textstyle \prod_1^k \mathfrak{g}$, then one puts

$$f(\varphi_1, \dotsc, \varphi_k)(v_1, \dotsc, v_q) = {1 \over q!} \sum_{\sigma} \operatorname{sgn}(\sigma) f(\varphi_1(v_{\sigma(1)}, \dotsc, v_{\sigma(q_1)}), \dotsc, \varphi_k(v_{\sigma(q - q_k + 1)}, \dotsc, v_{\sigma(q)}))$$

where $q = q_1 + \ldots + q_k$ and $\varphi_i$ are $\mathfrak{g}$-valued $q_i$-forms. Moreover, given a vector space $V$, the same formula can be used to define the $V$-valued form $f(\varphi, \eta)$ when

$$f: \mathfrak{g} \times V \to V$$

is a multilinear map, $\varphi$ is a $\mathfrak{g}$-valued form and $\eta$ is a $V$-valued form. Note that, when

$$f([x, y], z) = f(x, f(y, z)) - f(y, f(x, z)) {,} \qquad (*)$$

giving $f$ amounts to giving an action of $\mathfrak{g}$ on $V$; i.e., $f$ determines the representation

$$\rho: \mathfrak{g} \to V, \rho(x)y = f(x, y)$$

and, conversely, any representation $\rho$ determines $f$ with the condition $(*)$. For example, if $f(x, y) = [x, y]$ (the bracket of $\mathfrak{g}$), then we recover the definition of $[\cdot \wedge \cdot]$ given above, with $\rho = \operatorname{ad}$, the adjoint representation. (Note the relation between $f$ and $\rho$ above is thus like the relation between a bracket and $\operatorname{ad}$.)

In general, if $\alpha$ is a $\mathfrak{gl}(V)$-valued $p$-form and $\varphi$ is a $V$-valued $q$-form, then one more commonly writes $\alpha \cdot \varphi = f(\alpha, \varphi)$ when $f(T, x) = T x$. Explicitly,

$$(\alpha \cdot \phi)(v_1, \dotsc, v_{p+q}) = {1 \over (p+q)!} \sum_{\sigma} \operatorname{sgn}(\sigma) \alpha(v_{\sigma(1)}, \dotsc, v_{\sigma(p)}) \phi(v_{\sigma(p+1)}, \dotsc, v_{\sigma(p+q)}).$$

With this notation, one has for example:

$$\operatorname{ad}(\alpha) \cdot \phi = [\alpha \wedge \phi]$$.

Example: If $\omega$ is a $\mathfrak{g}$-valued one-form (for example, a connection form), $\rho$ a representation of $\mathfrak{g}$ on a vector space $V$ and $\varphi$ a $V$-valued zero-form, then

$\rho([\omega \wedge \omega]) \cdot \varphi = 2 \rho(\omega) \cdot (\rho(\omega) \cdot \varphi).$

== Forms with values in an adjoint bundle ==
Let $P$ be a smooth principal bundle with structure group $G$ and $\mathfrak{g} = \operatorname{Lie}(G)$. $G$ acts on $\mathfrak{g}$ via adjoint representation and so one can form the associated bundle:

$$\mathfrak{g}_P = P \times_{\operatorname{Ad}} \mathfrak{g}.$$

Any $\mathfrak{g}_P$-valued forms on the base space of $P$ are in a natural one-to-one correspondence with any tensorial forms on $P$ of adjoint type.

== See also ==
- Maurer–Cartan form
- Adjoint bundle
