= Adjoint bundle =

Vector bundle in mathematics

In mathematics, an adjoint bundle is a vector bundle naturally associated with any smooth principal bundle. The fibers of the adjoint bundle carry a Lie algebra structure making the adjoint bundle into a (nonassociative) algebra bundle. Adjoint bundles have important applications in the theory of connections as well as in gauge theory.

== Formal definition ==
Let G be a Lie group with Lie algebra $\mathfrak g$, and let P be a principal G-bundle over a smooth manifold M. Let

$$\mathrm{Ad}: G\to\mathrm{Aut}(\mathfrak g)\sub\mathrm{GL}(\mathfrak g)$$

be the (left) adjoint representation of G. The adjoint bundle of P is the associated bundle

$$\mathrm{ad} P = P\times_{\mathrm{Ad}}\mathfrak g$$

The adjoint bundle is also commonly denoted by $\mathfrak g_P$. Explicitly, elements of the adjoint bundle are equivalence classes of pairs [p, X] for p ∈ P and X ∈ $\mathfrak g$ such that

$$[p\cdot g,X] = [p,\mathrm{Ad}_{g}(X)]$$

for all g ∈ G. Since the structure group of the adjoint bundle consists of Lie algebra automorphisms, the fibers naturally carry a Lie algebra structure making the adjoint bundle into a bundle of Lie algebras over M.

== Restriction to a closed subgroup ==
Let G be any Lie group with Lie algebra $\mathfrak g$, and let H be a closed subgroup of G. Via the (left) adjoint representation of G $\mathfrak g$, G becomes a topological transformation group $\mathfrak g$. By restricting the adjoint representation of G to the subgroup H,

$\mathrm{Ad\vert_H}: H \hookrightarrow G \to \mathrm{Aut}(\mathfrak g)$

also H acts as a topological transformation group on $\mathfrak g$. For every h in H, $Ad\vert_H(h): \mathfrak g \mapsto \mathfrak g$ is a Lie algebra automorphism.

Since H is a closed subgroup of Lie group G, the homogeneous space M=G/H is the base space of a principal bundle $G \to M$ with total space G and structure group H. So the existence of H-valued transition functions $g_{ij}: U_{i}\cap U_{j} \rightarrow H$ is assured, where $U_{i}$ is an open covering for M, and the transition functions $g_{ij}$ form a cocycle of transition function on M. The associated fibre bundle $\xi= (E,p,M,\mathfrak g) = G[(\mathfrak g, \mathrm{Ad\vert_H})]$ is a bundle of Lie algebras, with typical fibre $\mathfrak g$, and a continuous mapping $\Theta :\xi \oplus \xi \rightarrow \xi$ induces on each fibre the Lie bracket.

== Properties ==
Differential forms on M with values in $\mathrm{ad} P$ are in one-to-one correspondence with horizontal, G-equivariant Lie algebra-valued forms on P. A prime example is the curvature of any connection on P which may be regarded as a 2-form on M with values in $\mathrm{ad} P$.

The space of sections of the adjoint bundle is naturally an (infinite-dimensional) Lie algebra. It may be regarded as the Lie algebra of the infinite-dimensional Lie group of gauge transformations of P which can be thought of as sections of the bundle $P \times_{\mathrm conj} G$ where conj is the action of G on itself by (left) conjugation.

If $P=\mathcal{F}(E)$ is the frame bundle of a vector bundle $E\to M$, then $P$ has fibre in the general linear group $\operatorname{GL}(r)$ (either real or complex, depending on $E$) where $\operatorname{rank}(E) = r$. This structure group has Lie algebra consisting of all $r\times r$ matrices $\operatorname{Mat}(r)$, and these can be thought of as the endomorphisms of the vector bundle $E$. Indeed, there is a natural isomorphism $\operatorname{ad} \mathcal{F}(E) \cong \operatorname{End}(E)$.
