= Robert Mills (physicist) =

American physicist (1927–1999)

Robert Laurence Mills
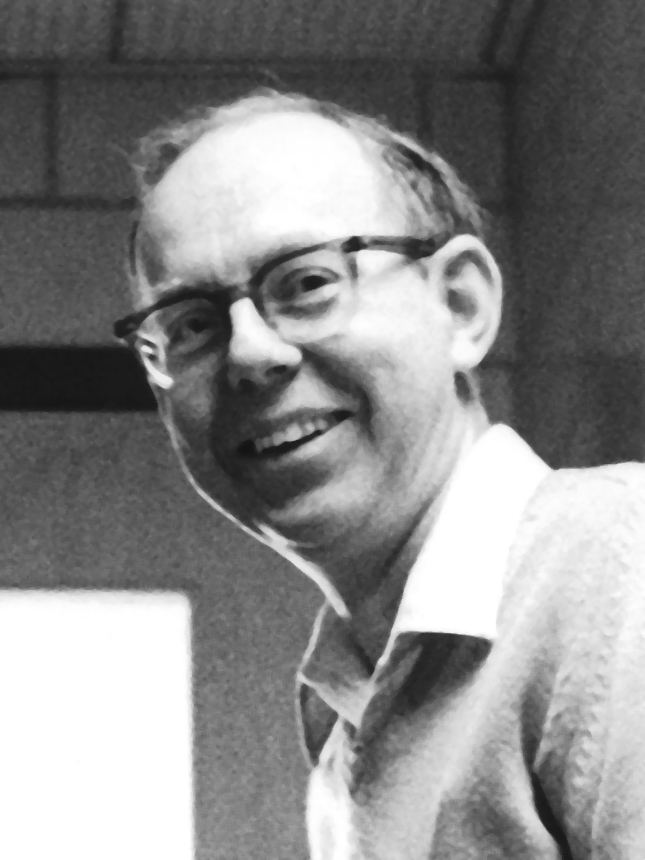
- Robert Laurence Mills
- Born: April 15, 1927; Englewood, New Jersey, U.S.
- Died: October 27, 1999 (aged 72); East Charleston, Vermont, U.S.
- Education: Columbia University
- Known for: Yang–Mills theory
- Scientific career
- Fields: Theoretical physics, quantum field theory
- Workplaces: Ohio State University
- Academic advisors: Norman Myles Kroll

Robert Laurence Mills (April 15, 1927 – October 27, 1999) was an American physicist, specializing in quantum field theory, the theory of alloys, and many-body theory.

While sharing an office at Brookhaven National Laboratory, C.N. Yang and Robert Mills formulated in 1954 a theory now known as the Yang–Mills theory – "the foundation for current understanding of how subatomic particles interact, a contribution which has restructured modern physics and mathematics."

Mathematically, Yang and Mills proposed a tensor equation for what are now called Yang–Mills fields (this equation reduces to Maxwell's equations as a special case; see gauge theory):

$\partial_{\mu}F^{\mu\nu} + 2 \epsilon ( b_\mu \times F^{\mu\nu} ) = J^\nu$.

== Biography ==
Mills was born in Englewood, New Jersey, son of Dorothy C. and the american economist Frederick C. Mills. He graduated from George School in Pennsylvania in early 1944, and studied at Columbia College from 1944 to 1948, while on leave from the Coast Guard. Mills demonstrated his mathematical ability by becoming a Putnam Fellow in 1948, and by receiving first-class honors in the Tripos. Mills, who was still a novice theoretical physicist, met Yang and assisted him in polishing Yang's hypothesis on non-abelian gauge fields, which later became the Yang-Mills Theory, the heart of modern particle physics.

Employing the general field theory developed by him and Yang Cheng Ning in the 1950s, H. Fritzsch and H. Leutwyler, together with american physicist Murray Gell-Mann introduced the concept of colour as the source of a "strong field" into the theory of QCD. Thus, Yang and Robert Mills, together, were key to the progress in the field, by developing a theory in which the carrier particles of a force can themselves radiate further carrier particles. (This is different from QED, where the photons that carry the electromagnetic force do not radiate further photons).

The mathematical ability Mills displayed early on was mastered in his eventual career as a full-time theoretical physicist. He earned a master's degree from Cambridge, and a PhD in Physics under Norman Kroll, from Columbia University in 1955. After a year at the Institute for Advanced Study in Princeton, New Jersey, Mills became professor of physics at Ohio State University in 1956. He remained at Ohio State University until his retirement in 1995.

Mills and Yang shared the 1980 Rumford Premium Prize from the American Academy of Arts and Sciences for their "development of a generalized gauge invariant field theory" in 1954.

== Personal life ==
Mills was married to Elise Ackley in 1948. Together they had sons Edward and Jonathan, and daughters Catherine, Susan, and Dorothy. The Mills family lived for many years in Columbus, Ohio, during Mills' tenure as professor at Ohio State University. He was an elder of Indianola Presbyterian Church and active in the international student community in Columbus. The family also spent considerable time during the summer and winter breaks at their property on Echo Lake in Charleston, Vermont, where Robert spent his final months.

== Selected publications ==
Yang–Mills theory

- Yang, C. N.; Mills, R. L. (1954). "Conservation of Isotopic Spin and Isotopic Gauge Invariance". Phys. Rev. 96 (1): 191–195. Bibcode:1954PhRv...96..191Y. doi:10.1103/PhysRev.96.191.
- Mills, R. L.; Yang, C. N. (1966). "Treatment of Overlapping Divergences in the Photon Self-Energy Function". Progress of Theoretical Physics Supplement. 37: 507. Bibcode:1966PThPS..37..507M. doi:10.1143/PTPS.37.507.
- Mills, R. L. (1979). Model of confinement for gauge theories. Physical Review Letters, 43(8): 549.
- Mills, R. L. (1971). Propagator gauge transformations for non-abelian gauge fields. Physical Review D, 3(12): 2969.
