= Curvature form =

Term in differential geometry

In differential geometry, the curvature form describes curvature of a connection on a principal bundle. The Riemann curvature tensor in Riemannian geometry can be considered as a special case.

== Definition ==
Let G be a Lie group with Lie algebra $\mathfrak g$, and P → B be a principal G-bundle. Let ω be an Ehresmann connection on P (which is a $\mathfrak g$-valued one-form on P).

Then the curvature form is the $\mathfrak g$-valued 2-form on P defined by

$$\Omega=d\omega + {1 \over 2}[\omega \wedge \omega] = D \omega.$$

(In another convention, 1/2 does not appear.) Here $d$ stands for exterior derivative, $[\cdot \wedge \cdot]$ is defined in the article "Lie algebra-valued form" and D denotes the exterior covariant derivative. In other terms,

$$\,\Omega(X, Y)= d\omega(X,Y) + {1 \over 2}[\omega(X),\omega(Y)]$$

where X, Y are tangent vectors to P.

There is also another expression for Ω: if X, Y are horizontal vector fields on P, then

$$\sigma\Omega(X, Y) = -\omega([X, Y]) = -[X, Y] + h[X, Y]$$

where hZ means the horizontal component of Z, on the right we identified a vertical vector field and a Lie algebra element generating it (fundamental vector field), and $\sigma\in \{1, 2\}$ is the inverse of the normalization factor used by convention in the formula for the exterior derivative.

A connection is said to be flat if its curvature vanishes: Ω = 0. Equivalently, a connection is flat if the structure group can be reduced to the same underlying group but with the discrete topology.

=== Curvature form in a vector bundle ===
If E → B is a vector bundle, then one can also think of ω as a matrix of 1-forms and the above formula becomes the structure equation of E. Cartan:

$$\,\Omega = d\omega + \omega \wedge \omega,$$

where $\wedge$ is the wedge product. More precisely, if ${\omega^i}_j$ and ${\Omega^i}_j$ denote components of ω and Ω correspondingly, (so each ${\omega^i}_j$ is a usual 1-form and each ${\Omega^i}_j$ is a usual 2-form) then

$$\Omega^i_j = d{\omega^i}_j + \sum_k {\omega^i}_k \wedge {\omega^k}_j.$$

For example, for the tangent bundle of a Riemannian manifold, the structure group is O(n) and Ω is a 2-form with values in the Lie algebra of O(n), i.e. the antisymmetric matrices. In this case the form Ω is an alternative description of the curvature tensor, i.e.

$$\,R(X, Y) = \Omega(X, Y),$$

using the standard notation for the Riemannian curvature tensor.

== Bianchi identities ==
If $\theta$ is the canonical vector-valued 1-form on the frame bundle, the torsion $\Theta$ of the connection form $\omega$ is the vector-valued 2-form defined by the structure equation

$$\Theta = d\theta + \omega\wedge\theta = D\theta,$$

where as above D denotes the exterior covariant derivative.

The first Bianchi identity takes the form

$$D\Theta = \Omega\wedge\theta.$$

The second Bianchi identity takes the form

$$\, D \Omega = 0$$

and is valid more generally for any connection in a principal bundle.

The Bianchi identities can be written in tensor notation as: $R_{abmn;\ell} + R_{ab\ell m;n} + R_{abn\ell;m} = 0.$

The contracted Bianchi identities are used to derive the Einstein tensor in the Einstein field equations, a key component in the general theory of relativity.

== See also ==
- Connection (principal bundle)
- Basic introduction to the mathematics of curved spacetime
- Contracted Bianchi identities
- Einstein tensor
- Einstein field equations
- General theory of relativity
- Chern-Simons form
- Curvature of Riemannian manifolds
- Gauge theory
