= Connection (principal bundle) =

Concept in mathematics

In mathematics, and especially differential geometry and gauge theory, a connection is a device that defines a notion of parallel transport on the bundle; that is, a way to "connect" or identify fibers over nearby points. A principal G-connection on a principal G-bundle $P$ over a smooth manifold $M$ is a particular type of connection that is compatible with the action of the group $G$.

A principal connection can be viewed as a special case of the notion of an Ehresmann connection, and is sometimes called a principal Ehresmann connection. It gives rise to (Ehresmann) connections on any fiber bundle associated to $P$ via the associated bundle construction. In particular, on any associated vector bundle the principal connection induces a covariant derivative, an operator that can differentiate sections of that bundle along tangent directions in the base manifold. Principal connections generalize to arbitrary principal bundles the concept of a linear connection on the frame bundle of a smooth manifold.

== Formal definition ==
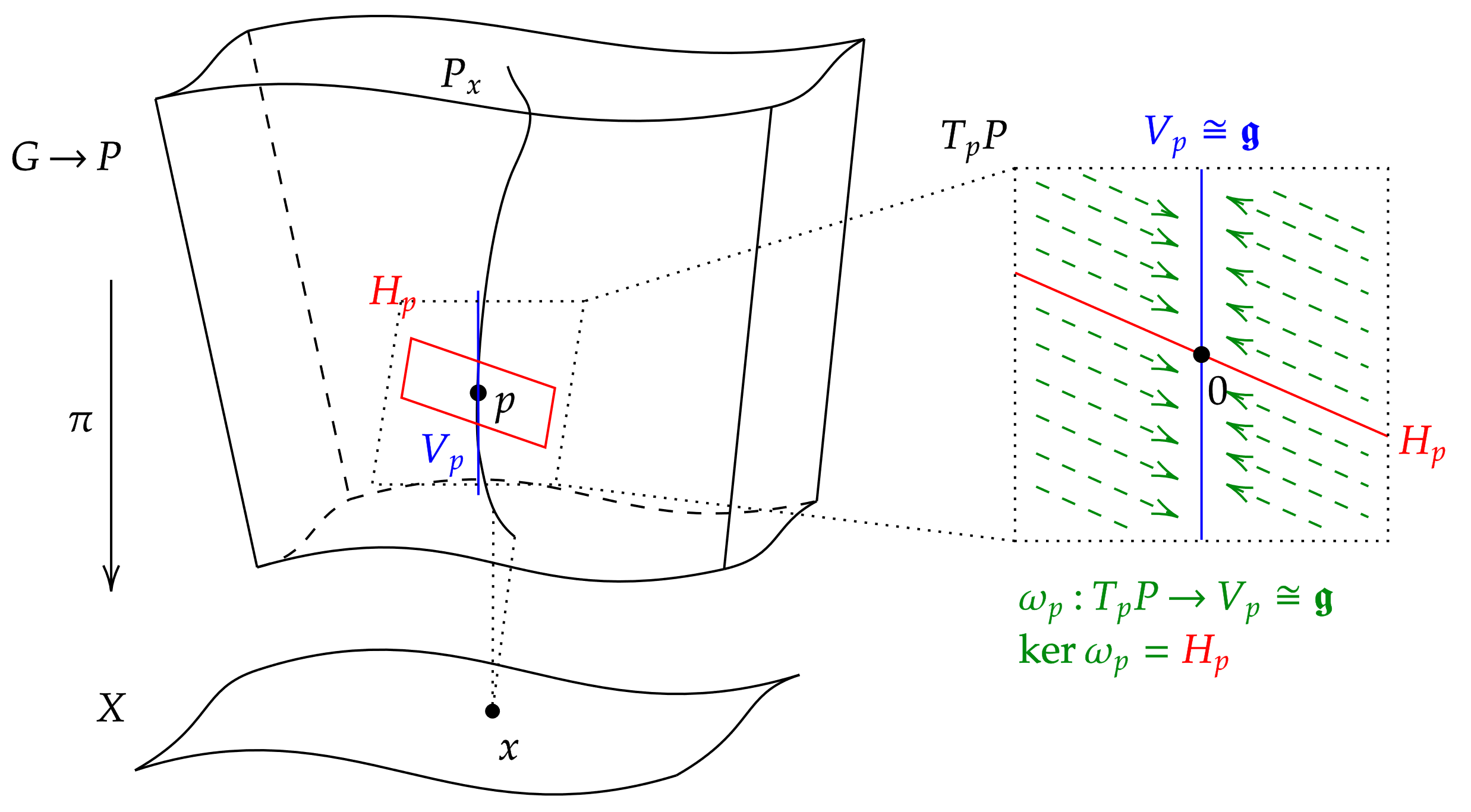
A principal bundle connection form $\omega$ may be thought of as a projection operator on the tangent bundle $TP$ of the principal bundle $P$. The kernel of the connection form is given by the horizontal subspaces for the associated Ehresmann connection.

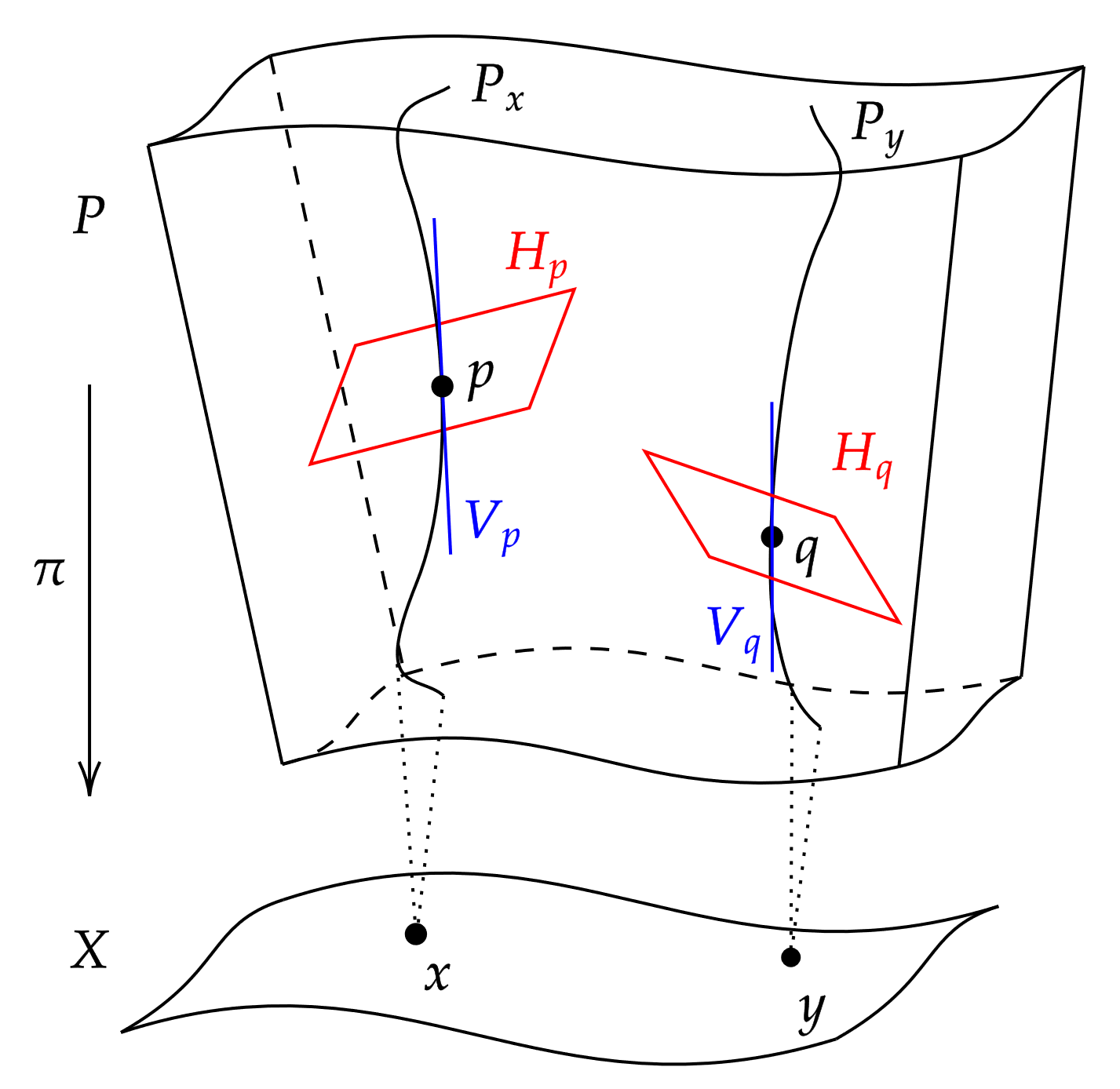
A connection is equivalently specified by a choice of horizontal subspace $H_p\subset T_pP$ for every tangent space to the principal bundle $P$.

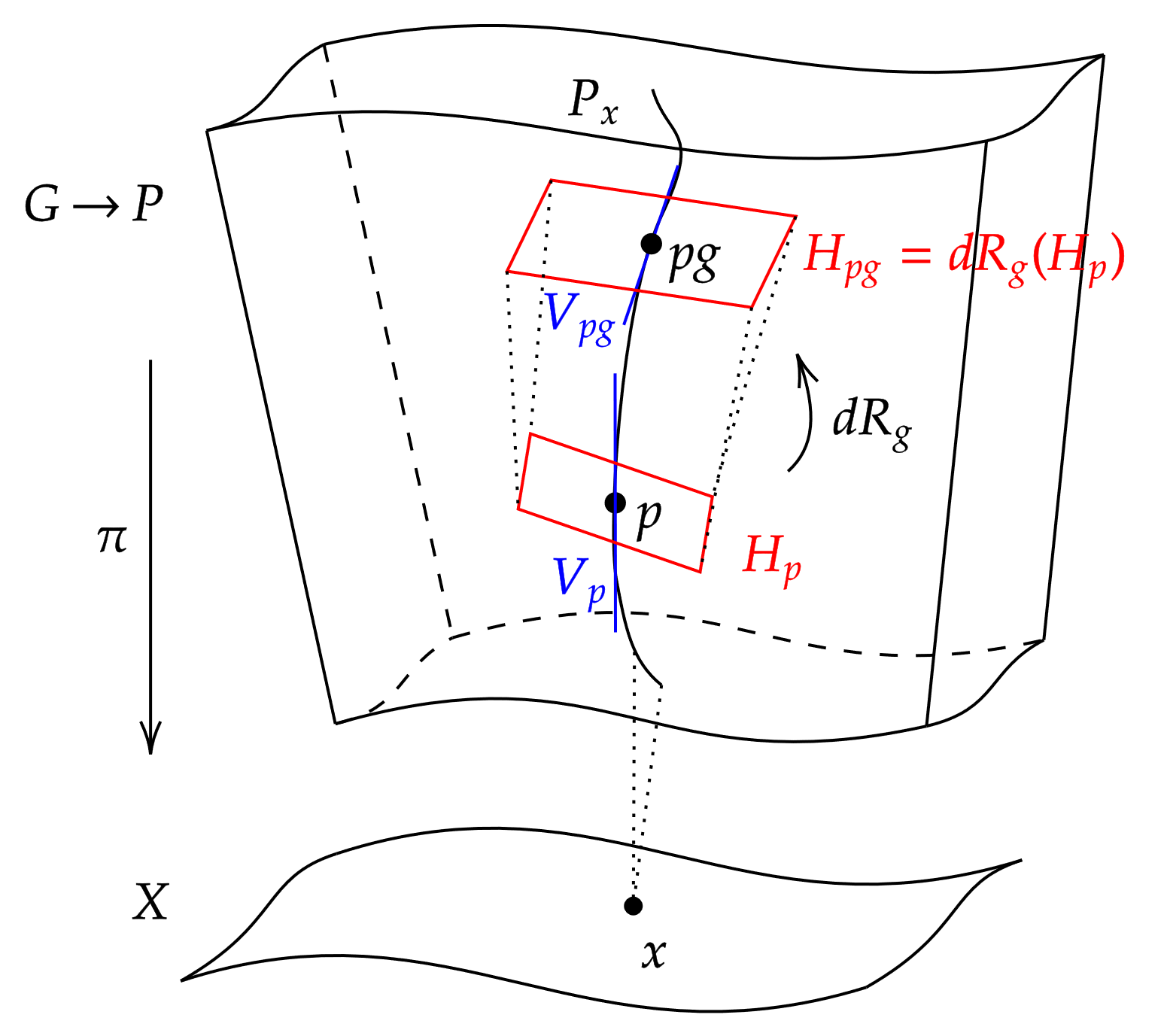
A principal bundle connection is required to be compatible with the right group action of $G$ on $P$. This can be visualized as the right multiplication $R_g$ taking the horizontal subspaces into each other. This equivariance of the horizontal subspaces $H\subset TP$ interpreted in terms of the connection form $\omega$ leads to its characteristic equivariance properties.

Let $\pi : P \to M$ be a smooth principal G-bundle over a smooth manifold $M$. Then a principal $G$-connection on $P$ is a differential 1-form on $P$ with values in the Lie algebra $\mathfrak g$ of $G$ which is $G$-equivariant and reproduces the Lie algebra generators of the fundamental vector fields on $P$.

In other words, it is an element ω of $\Omega^1(P,\mathfrak g)\cong C^\infty(P, T^*P\otimes\mathfrak g)$ such that

1. $\hbox{Ad}_g(R_g^*\omega)=\omega$ where $R_g$ denotes right multiplication by $g$, and $\operatorname{Ad}_g$ is the adjoint representation on $\mathfrak g$ (explicitly, $\operatorname{Ad}_gX = \frac{d}{dt}g\exp(tX)g^{-1}\bigl|_{t=0}$);
2. if $\xi\in \mathfrak g$ and $X_\xi$ is the vector field on P associated to ξ by differentiating the G action on P, then $\omega(X_\xi)=\xi$ (identically on $P$).

Sometimes the term principal $G$-connection refers to the pair $(P,\omega)$ and $\omega$ itself is called the connection form or connection 1-form of the principal connection.

=== Computational remarks ===
Most known non-trivial computations of principal $G$-connections are done with homogeneous spaces because of the triviality of the (co)tangent bundle. (For example, let $G \to H \to H/G$, be a principal $G$-bundle over $H/G$.) This means that real-valued 1-forms on the total space $H$ are canonically isomorphic to $C^\infty(H,\mathfrak{h}^*)$, where $\mathfrak{h}^*$ is the dual Lie algebra, hence $G$-connections are in bijection with $C^\infty(H,\mathfrak{h}^*\otimes \mathfrak{g})^G$.

=== Relation to Ehresmann connections ===
A principal $G$-connection $\omega$ on $P$ determines an Ehresmann connection on $P$ in the following way. First note that the fundamental vector fields generating the $G$ action on $P$ provide a bundle isomorphism (covering the identity of $P$) from the bundle $V$ to $P\times\mathfrak g$, where $V=\ker(d\pi)$ is the kernel of the tangent mapping ${\mathrm d}\pi\colon TP\to TM$ which is called the vertical bundle of $P$. It follows that $\omega$ determines uniquely a bundle map $v:TP\rightarrow V$ which is the identity on $V$. Such a projection $v$ is uniquely determined by its kernel, which is a smooth subbundle $H$ of $TP$ (called the horizontal bundle) such that $TP=V\oplus H$. This is an Ehresmann connection.

Conversely, an Ehresmann connection $H\subset TP$ (or $v:TP\rightarrow V$) on $P$ defines a principal $G$-connection $\omega$ if and only if it is $G$-equivariant in the sense that $H_{pg}=\mathrm d(R_g)_p(H_{p})$.

=== Pull back via trivializing section ===
A trivializing section of a principal bundle $P$ is given by a section s of $P$ over an open subset $U$ of $M$. Then the pullback s^{*}ω of a principal connection is a 1-form on $U$ with values in $\mathfrak g$. If the section s is replaced by a new section sg, defined by (sg)(x) = s(x)g(x), where g:M→G is a smooth map, then $(sg)^* \omega = \operatorname{Ad}(g)^{-1}s^* \omega + g^{-1} dg$. The principal connection is uniquely determined by this family of $\mathfrak g$-valued 1-forms, and these 1-forms are also called connection forms or connection 1-forms, particularly in older or more physics-oriented literature.

=== Bundle of principal connections ===
The group $G$ acts on the tangent bundle $TP$ by right translation. The quotient space TP/G is also a manifold, and inherits the structure of a fibre bundle over TM which shall be denoted dπ:TP/G→TM. Let ρ:TP/G→M be the projection onto M. The fibres of the bundle TP/G under the projection ρ carry an additive structure.

The bundle TP/G is called the bundle of principal connections (Kobayashi 1957). A section Γ of dπ:TP/G→TM such that Γ : TM → TP/G is a linear morphism of vector bundles over M, can be identified with a principal connection in P. Conversely, a principal connection as defined above gives rise to such a section Γ of TP/G.

Finally, let Γ be a principal connection in this sense. Let q:TP→TP/G be the quotient map. The horizontal distribution of the connection is the bundle

$H = q^{-1}\Gamma(TM) \subset TP.$ We see again the link to the horizontal bundle and thus Ehresmann connection.

=== Affine property ===
If ω and ω′ are principal connections on a principal bundle P, then the difference ω′ − ω is a $\mathfrak g$-valued 1-form on P that is not only G-equivariant, but horizontal in the sense that it vanishes on any section of the vertical bundle V of P. Hence it is basic and so is determined by a 1-form on M with values in the adjoint bundle

$$\mathfrak g_P:=P\times^G\mathfrak g.$$

Conversely, any such one form defines (via pullback) a G-equivariant horizontal 1-form on P, and the space of principal G-connections is an affine space for this space of 1-forms.

== Examples ==
=== Maurer–Cartan connection ===
For the trivial principal $G$-bundle $\pi:E \to X$ where $E = G\times X$, there is a canonical connection^{pg 49}

$\omega_{MC} \in \Omega^1(E,\mathfrak{g})$

called the Maurer-Cartan connection. It is defined at a point $(g,x) \in G\times X$ by

$(\omega_{MC})_{(g,x)} = (L_{g^{-1}}\circ \pi_1)_*$ for $x \in X, g \in G$

which is a composition

$T_{(g,x)}E \xrightarrow{\pi_{1*}} T_gG \xrightarrow{(L_{g^{-1}})_*} T_eG = \mathfrak{g}$

defining the 1-form. Note that

$\omega_0 = (L_{g^{-1}})_*: T_gG \to T_eG = \mathfrak{g}$

is the Maurer–Cartan form on the Lie group $G$ and $\omega_{MC} = \pi_1^*\omega_0$.

=== Trivial bundle ===
For a trivial principal $G$-bundle $\pi:E \to X$, the identity section $i: X \to G\times X$ given by $i(x) = (e,x)$ defines a 1-1 correspondence

$i^*:\Omega^1(E,\mathfrak{g}) \to \Omega^1(X,\mathfrak{g})$

between connections on $E$ and $\mathfrak{g}$-valued 1-forms on $X$^{pg 53}. For a $\mathfrak{g}$-valued 1-form $A$ on $X$, there is a unique 1-form $\tilde{A}$ on $E$ such that

1. $\tilde{A}(X) = 0$ for $X \in T_xE$ a vertical vector
2. $R_g^*\tilde{A} = \text{Ad}(g^{-1}) \circ \tilde{A}$ for any $g \in G$

Then given this 1-form, a connection on $E$ can be constructed by taking the sum

$\omega_{MC} + \tilde{A}$

giving an actual connection on $E$. This unique 1-form can be constructed by first looking at it restricted to $(e,x)$ for $x \in X$. Then, $\tilde{A}_{(e,x)}$ is determined by $A$ because $T_{(x,e)}E = ker(\pi_*)\oplus i_*T_xX$ and we can get $\tilde{A}_{(g,x)}$by taking

$\tilde{A}_{(g,x)} = R^*_g\tilde{A}_{(e,x)} = \text{Ad}(g^{-1})\circ \tilde{A}_{(e,x)}$

Similarly, the form

$\tilde{A}_{(x,g)} = \text{Ad}(g^{-1}) \circ A_x \circ \pi_*: T_{(x,g)}E \to \mathfrak{g}$

defines a 1-form giving the properties 1 and 2 listed above.

==== Extending this to non-trivial bundles ====
This statement can be refined^{pg 55} even further for non-trivial bundles $E \to X$ by considering an open covering $\mathcal{U} = \{U_a\}_{a \in I}$ of $X$ with trivializations $\{\phi_a\}_{a \in I}$ and transition functions $\{g_{ab}\}_{a,b\in I}$. Then, there is a 1-1 correspondence between connections on $E$ and collections of 1-forms

$\{A_a \in \Omega_1(U_a,\mathfrak{g}) \}_{a \in I}$

which satisfy

$A_b = Ad(g_{ab}^{-1})\circ A_a + g_{ab}^*\omega_0$

on the intersections $U_{ab}$ for $\omega_0$ the Maurer–Cartan form on $G$, $\omega_0 = g^{-1}dg$ in matrix form.

==== Global reformulation of space of connections ====
For a principal $G$ bundle $\pi: E \to M$ the set of connections in $E$ is an affine space^{pg 57} for the vector space $\Omega^1(M,E_\mathfrak{g})$ where $E_\mathfrak{g}$ is the associated adjoint vector bundle. This implies for any two connections $\omega_0, \omega_1$ there exists a form $A \in \Omega^1(M, E_\mathfrak{g})$ such that

$\omega_0 = \omega_1 + A$

We denote the set of connections as $\mathcal{A}(E)$, or just $\mathcal{A}$ if the context is clear.

=== Connection on the complex Hopf-bundle ===
We^{pg 94} can construct $\mathbb{CP}^n$ as a principal $\mathbb{C}^*$-bundle $\gamma:H_\mathbb{C} \to \mathbb{CP}^n$ where $H_\mathbb{C} = \mathbb{C}^{n+1}-\{0\}$ and $\gamma$ is the projection map

$\gamma(z_0,\ldots,z_n) = [z_0,\ldots,z_n]$

Note the Lie algebra of $\mathbb{C}^* = GL(1,\mathbb{C})$ is just the complex plane. The 1-form $\omega \in \Omega^1(H_\mathbb{C},\mathbb{C})$ defined as

$$\begin{align}
\omega &= \frac{\overline{z}^tdz}{|z|^2} \\
&= \sum_{i=0}^n\frac{\overline{z}_i}{|z|^2}dz_i
\end{align}$$

forms a connection, which can be checked by verifying the definition. For any fixed $\lambda \in \mathbb{C}^*$ we have

$$\begin{align}
R_\lambda^*\omega &= \frac{\overline{(z\lambda)}^td(z\lambda)}{|z\lambda|^2} \\
&= \frac{
\overline{\lambda}\lambda\overline{z}^tdz
}{|\lambda|^2\cdot |z|^2}
\end{align}$$

and since $|\lambda|^2 = \overline{\lambda}{\lambda}$, we have $\mathbb{C}^*$-invariance. This is because the adjoint action is trivial since the Lie algebra is Abelian. For constructing the splitting, note for any $z \in H_\mathbb{C}$ we have a short exact sequence

$0 \to \mathbb{C} \xrightarrow{v_z} T_zH_\mathbb{C} \xrightarrow{\gamma_*} T_{[z]}\mathbb{CP}^n \to 0$

where $v_z$ is defined as

$v_z(\lambda) = z\cdot \lambda$

so it acts as scaling in the fiber (which restricts to the corresponding $\mathbb{C}^*$-action). Taking $\omega_z\circ v_z(\lambda)$ we get

$$\begin{align}
\omega_z\circ v_z(\lambda) &= \frac{\overline{z}dz}{|z|^2}(z\lambda) \\
&= \frac{\overline{z}z\lambda}{|z|^2} \\
&= \lambda
\end{align}$$

where the second equality follows because we are considering $z\lambda$ a vertical tangent vector, and $dz(z\lambda) = z\lambda$. The notation is somewhat confusing, but if we expand out each term

$$\begin{align}
dz &= dz_0 + \cdots + dz_n \\
z &= a_0z_0 + \cdots +a_nz_n \\
dz(z) &= a_0 + \cdots + a_n \\
dz(\lambda z) &= \lambda\cdot (a_0 + \cdots + a_n) \\
\overline{z} &= \overline{a_0} + \cdots + \overline{a_n}
\end{align}$$

it becomes more clear (where $a_i \in \mathbb{C}$).

== Induced covariant and exterior derivatives ==
For any linear representation W of G there is an associated vector bundle $P\times^G W$ over M, and a principal connection induces a covariant derivative on any such vector bundle. This covariant derivative can be defined using the fact that the space of sections of $P\times^G W$ over M is isomorphic to the space of G-equivariant W-valued functions on P. More generally, the space of k-forms with values in $P\times^G W$ is identified with the space of G-equivariant and horizontal W-valued k-forms on P. If α is such a k-form, then its exterior derivative dα, although G-equivariant, is no longer horizontal. However, the combination dα+ωΛα is. This defines an exterior covariant derivative d^{ω} from $P\times^G W$-valued k-forms on M to $P\times^G W$-valued (k+1)-forms on M. In particular, when k=0, we obtain a covariant derivative on $P\times^G W$.

== Curvature form ==
The curvature form of a principal G-connection ω is the $\mathfrak g$-valued 2-form Ω defined by

$$\Omega=d\omega +\tfrac12 [\omega\wedge\omega].$$

It is G-equivariant and horizontal, hence corresponds to a 2-form on M with values in $\mathfrak g_P$. The identification of the curvature with this quantity is sometimes called the (Cartan's) second structure equation. Historically, the emergence of the structure equations are found in the development of the Cartan connection. When transposed into the context of Lie groups, the structure equations are known as the Maurer–Cartan equations: they are the same equations, but in a different setting and notation.

=== Flat connections and characterization of bundles with flat connections ===
We say that a connection $\omega$ is flat if its curvature form $\Omega = 0$. There is a useful characterization of principal bundles with flat connections; that is, a principal $G$-bundle $\pi: E \to X$ has a flat connection^{pg 68} if and only if there exists an open covering $\{U_a\}_{a\in I}$ with trivializations $\left\{ \phi_a \right\}_{a \in I}$ such that all transition functions

$g_{ab}: U_a\cap U_b \to G$

are constant. This is useful because it gives a recipe for constructing flat principal $G$-bundles over smooth manifolds; namely taking an open cover and defining trivializations with constant transition functions.

== Connections on frame bundles and torsion ==
If the principal bundle P is the frame bundle, or (more generally) if it has a solder form, then the connection is an example of an affine connection, and the curvature is not the only invariant, since the additional structure of the solder form θ, which is an equivariant R^{n}-valued 1-form on P, should be taken into account. In particular, the torsion form on P, is an R^{n}-valued 2-form Θ defined by

$$\Theta=\mathrm d\theta+\omega\wedge\theta.$$

Θ is G-equivariant and horizontal, and so it descends to a tangent-valued 2-form on M, called the torsion. This equation is sometimes called the (Cartan's) first structure equation.

== Definition in algebraic geometry ==
If X is a scheme (or more generally, stack, derived stack, or even prestack), we can associate to it its so-called de Rham stack, denoted X_{dR}. This has the property that a principal G bundle over X_{dR} is the same thing as a G bundle with *flat* connection over X.
