= Adjoint representation =

Mathematical term

In mathematics, the adjoint representation (or adjoint action) of a Lie group G is a way of representing the elements of the group as linear transformations of the group's Lie algebra, considered as a vector space. For example, if G is $\mathrm{GL}(n, \mathbb{R})$, the Lie group of real n-by-n invertible matrices, then the adjoint representation is the group homomorphism that sends an invertible n-by-n matrix $g$ to an endomorphism of the vector space of all linear transformations of $\mathbb{R}^n$ defined by: $x \mapsto g x g^{-1}$.

For any Lie group, this natural representation is obtained by linearizing (i.e. taking the differential of) the action of G on itself by conjugation. The adjoint representation can be defined for linear algebraic groups over arbitrary fields.

== Definition ==
Let $G$ be a Lie group, and let

$$\Psi: G \to \operatorname{Aut}(G)$$

be the mapping $g\mapsto\Psi_g$, with $\operatorname{Aut}(G)$ the automorphism group of $G$ and $\Psi_g:G\rightarrow G$ given by the inner automorphism (conjugation)

$$\Psi_g(h)= ghg^{-1}~.$$

This $\Psi$ is a group homomorphism (it is a Lie group homomorphism if $G$ is connected).

For each $g$ in $G$, define $\operatorname{Ad}_g$ to be the derivative of $\Psi_g$ at the origin:

$$\operatorname{Ad}_g = (d\Psi_g)_e : T_eG \rightarrow T_eG$$

where $d$ is the differential and $\mathfrak{g} = T_e G$ is the tangent space at the origin e (e being the identity element of the group G). Since $\Psi_g$ is a Lie group automorphism, Ad_{g} is a Lie algebra automorphism; i.e., an invertible linear transformation of $\mathfrak g$ to itself that preserves the Lie bracket. Moreover, since $g \mapsto \Psi_g$ is a group homomorphism, $g \mapsto \operatorname{Ad}_g$ too is a group homomorphism. Hence, the map

$$\mathrm{Ad}\colon G \to \mathrm{Aut}(\mathfrak g), \, g \mapsto \mathrm{Ad}_g$$

is a group representation called the adjoint representation of G.

If G is a linear Lie group, then the Lie algebra $\mathfrak{g}$ consists of matrices and the exponential map is the matrix exponential $\operatorname{exp}(X) = e^X$ for matrices X with small operator norms. We will compute the derivative of $\Psi_g$ at $e$. For g in G and small X in $\mathfrak{g}$, the curve $t\to \exp(tX)$ has derivative $X$ at t = 0, one then gets:

$$\operatorname{Ad}_g(X) = (d\Psi_g)_e (X)=(\Psi_g\circ \exp(tX))'(0)=(g\exp(tX)g^{-1})'(0)=gX g^{-1}$$

where on the right we have the products of matrices. If $G \subset \mathrm{GL}_n(\mathbb{C})$ is a closed subgroup (that is, G is a matrix Lie group), then this formula is valid for all g in G and all X in $\mathfrak g$.

Succinctly, an adjoint representation is an isotropy representation associated to the conjugation action of G around the identity element of G.

=== Derivative of Ad ===
One may always pass from a representation of a Lie group G to a representation of its Lie algebra by taking the derivative at the identity.

Taking the derivative of the adjoint map

$$\mathrm{Ad} : G \to \mathrm{Aut}(\mathfrak g)$$

at the identity element gives the adjoint representation of the Lie algebra $\mathfrak g = \operatorname{Lie}(G)$ of G:

$$\begin{align}
\mathrm{ad} : & \, \mathfrak g \to \mathrm{Der}(\mathfrak g) \\
& \,x \mapsto \operatorname{ad}_x = d(\operatorname{Ad})_e(x)
\end{align}$$

where $\mathrm{Der}(\mathfrak g) = \operatorname{Lie}(\operatorname{Aut}(\mathfrak{g}))$ is the Lie algebra of $\mathrm{Aut}(\mathfrak g)$ which may be identified with the derivation algebra of $\mathfrak g$. One can show that

$$\mathrm{ad}_x(y) = [x,y]\,$$

for all $x,y \in \mathfrak g$, where the right hand side is given (induced) by the Lie bracket of vector fields. Indeed, recall that, viewing $\mathfrak{g}$ as the Lie algebra of left-invariant vector fields on G, the bracket on $\mathfrak g$ is given as: for left-invariant vector fields X, Y,

$$[X, Y] = \lim_{t \to 0} {1 \over t}(d \varphi_{-t}(Y) - Y)$$

where $\varphi_t: G \to G$ denotes the flow generated by X. As it turns out, $\varphi_t(g) = g\varphi_t(e)$, roughly because both sides satisfy the same ODE defining the flow. That is, $\varphi_t = R_{\varphi_t(e)}$ where $R_h$ denotes the right multiplication by $h \in G$. On the other hand, since $\Psi_g = R_{g^{-1}} \circ L_g$, by the chain rule,

$$\operatorname{Ad}_g(Y) = d (R_{g^{-1}} \circ L_g)(Y) = d R_{g^{-1}} (d L_g(Y)) = d R_{g^{-1}}(Y)$$

as Y is left-invariant. Hence,

$$[X, Y] = \lim_{t \to 0} {1 \over t}(\operatorname{Ad}_{\varphi_t(e)}(Y) - Y)$$,

which is what was needed to show.

Thus, $\mathrm{ad}_x$ coincides with the same one defined in § Adjoint representation of a Lie algebra below. Ad and ad are related through the exponential map: Specifically, Ad_{exp(x)} = exp(ad_{x}) for all x in the Lie algebra. It is a consequence of the general result relating Lie group and Lie algebra homomorphisms via the exponential map.

If G is a linear Lie group, then the above computation simplifies: indeed, as noted early, $\operatorname{Ad}_g(Y) = gYg^{-1}$ and thus with $g = e^{tX}$,

$$\operatorname{Ad}_{e^{tX}}(Y) = e^{tX} Y e^{-tX}$$.

Taking the derivative of this at $t = 0$, we have:

$$\operatorname{ad}_X Y = XY - YX$$.

The general case can also be deduced from the linear case: indeed, let $G'$ be a linear Lie group having the same Lie algebra as that of G. Then the derivative of Ad at the identity element for G and that for G' coincide; hence, without loss of generality, G can be assumed to be G'.

The upper-case/lower-case notation is used extensively in the literature. Thus, for example, a vector x in the algebra $\mathfrak{g}$ generates a vector field X in the group G. Similarly, the adjoint map ad_{x}y = [x,y] of vectors in $\mathfrak{g}$ is homomorphic to the Lie derivative L_{X}Y = [X,Y] of vector fields on the group G considered as a manifold.

Further see the derivative of the exponential map.

== Adjoint representation of a Lie algebra ==
Let $\mathfrak{g}$ be a Lie algebra over some field. Given an element x of a Lie algebra $\mathfrak{g}$, one defines the adjoint action of x on $\mathfrak{g}$ as the map

$$\operatorname{ad}_x : \mathfrak{g} \to \mathfrak{g} \qquad\text{with}\qquad \operatorname{ad}_x (y) = [x, y]$$

for all y in $\mathfrak{g}$. It is called the adjoint endomorphism or adjoint action. ($\operatorname{ad}_x$ is also often denoted as $\operatorname{ad}(x)$.) Since a bracket is bilinear, this determines the linear mapping

$$\operatorname{ad}:\mathfrak{g} \to \mathfrak{gl}(\mathfrak{g}) = (\operatorname{End}(\mathfrak{g}), [\;,\;])$$

given by x ↦ ad_{x}. Within End$(\mathfrak{g})$, the bracket is, by definition, given by the commutator of the two operators:

$$[T, S] = T \circ S - S \circ T$$

where $\circ$ denotes composition of linear maps. Using the above definition of the bracket, the Jacobi identity

$$[x, [y, z]] + [y, [z, x]] + [z, [x, y]] = 0$$

takes the form

$$\left([\operatorname{ad}_x, \operatorname{ad}_y]\right)(z) = \left(\operatorname{ad}_{[x, y]}\right)(z)$$

where x, y, and z are arbitrary elements of $\mathfrak{g}$.

This last identity says that ad is a Lie algebra homomorphism; i.e., a linear mapping that takes brackets to brackets. Hence, ad is a representation of a Lie algebra and is called the adjoint representation of the algebra $\mathfrak{g}$. In a more module-theoretic language, the construction says that $\mathfrak{g}$ is a module over itself.

The kernel of ad is the center of $\mathfrak{g}$ (that's just rephrasing the definition). On the other hand, for each element z in $\mathfrak{g}$, the linear mapping $\delta = \operatorname{ad}_z$ obeys the Leibniz' law:

$$\delta ([x, y]) = [\delta(x),y] + [x, \delta(y)]$$

for all x and y in the algebra (the restatement of the Jacobi identity). That is to say, ad_{z} is a derivation and the image of $\mathfrak{g}$ under ad is a subalgebra of Der$(\mathfrak{g})$, the space of all derivations of $\mathfrak{g}$.

When $\mathfrak{g} = \operatorname{Lie}(G)$ is the Lie algebra of a Lie group G, ad is the differential of Ad at the identity element of G.

There is the following formula similar to the Leibniz formula: for scalars $\alpha, \beta$ and Lie algebra elements $x, y, z$,

$$(\operatorname{ad}_x - \alpha - \beta)^n [y, z] = \sum_{i = 0}^n \binom{n}{i} \left[(\operatorname{ad}_x - \alpha)^i y, (\operatorname{ad}_x - \beta)^{n - i} z\right].$$

== Structure constants ==
The explicit matrix elements of the adjoint representation are given by the structure constants of the algebra. That is, let {e^{i}} be a set of basis vectors for the algebra, with

$$[e^i,e^j]=\sum_k{c^{ij}}_k e^k.$$

Then the matrix elements for ad_{e^{i}} are given by

$${\left[ \operatorname{ad}_{e^i}\right]_k}^j = {c^{ij}}_k ~.$$

Thus, for example, the adjoint representation of su(2) is the defining representation of so(3).

== Examples ==
- If G is abelian of dimension n, the adjoint representation of G is the trivial n-dimensional representation.
- If G is a matrix Lie group (i.e. a closed subgroup of $\mathrm{GL}(n, \Complex)$), then its Lie algebra is an algebra of n×n matrices with the commutator for a Lie bracket (i.e. a subalgebra of $\mathfrak{gl}_n(\Complex)$). In this case, the adjoint map is given by Ad_{g}(x) = gxg^{−1}.
- If G is SL(2, R) (real 2×2 matrices with determinant 1), the Lie algebra of G consists of real 2×2 matrices with trace 0. The representation is equivalent to that given by the action of G by linear substitution on the space of binary (i.e., 2 variable) quadratic forms.

== Properties ==
The following table summarizes the properties of the various maps mentioned in the definition

$\Psi\colon G \to \operatorname{Aut}(G)\,$	$\Psi_g\colon G \to G\,$
Lie group homomorphism: $\Psi_{gh} = \Psi_g\Psi_h$; $(\Psi_g)^{-1} = \Psi_{g^{-1}}$	Lie group automorphism: $\Psi_g(ab) = \Psi_g(a)\Psi_g(b)$
$\operatorname{Ad}\colon G \to \operatorname{Aut}(\mathfrak{g})$	$\operatorname{Ad}_g\colon \mathfrak{g} \to \mathfrak{g}$
Lie group homomorphism: $\operatorname{Ad}_{gh} = \operatorname{Ad}_g\operatorname{Ad}_h$; $\left(\operatorname{Ad}_g\right)^{-1} = \operatorname{Ad}_{g^{-1}}$	Lie algebra automorphism: $\operatorname{Ad}_g$ is linear; $\operatorname{Ad}_g[x,y] = [\operatorname{Ad}_g x,\operatorname{Ad}_g y]$
$\operatorname{ad}\colon \mathfrak g \to \operatorname{Der}(\mathfrak g)$	$\operatorname{ad}_x\colon \mathfrak g \to \mathfrak g$
Lie algebra homomorphism: $\operatorname{ad}$ is linear; $\operatorname{ad}_{[x,y]} = [\operatorname{ad}_x, \operatorname{ad}_y]$	Lie algebra derivation: $\operatorname{ad}_x$ is linear; $\operatorname{ad}_x[y, z] = [\operatorname{ad}_x y, z] + [y, \operatorname{ad}_x z]$

The image of G under the adjoint representation is denoted by Ad(G). If G is connected, the kernel of the adjoint representation coincides with the kernel of Ψ which is just the center of G. Therefore, the adjoint representation of a connected Lie group G is faithful if and only if G is centerless. More generally, if G is not connected, then the kernel of the adjoint map is the centralizer of the identity component G_{0} of G. By the first isomorphism theorem we have

$$\mathrm{Ad}(G) \cong G/Z_G(G_0).$$

Given a finite-dimensional real Lie algebra $\mathfrak{g}$, by Lie's third theorem, there is a connected Lie group $\operatorname{Int}(\mathfrak{g})$ whose Lie algebra is the image of the adjoint representation of $\mathfrak{g}$ (i.e., $\operatorname{Lie}(\operatorname{Int}(\mathfrak{g})) = \operatorname{ad}(\mathfrak{g})$.) It is called the adjoint group of $\mathfrak{g}$.

Now, if $\mathfrak{g}$ is the Lie algebra of a connected Lie group G, then $\operatorname{Int}(\mathfrak{g})$ is the image of the adjoint representation of G: $\operatorname{Int}(\mathfrak{g}) = \operatorname{Ad}(G)$.

== Roots of a semisimple Lie group ==
If G is semisimple, the non-zero weights of the adjoint representation form a root system. (In general, one needs to pass to the complexification of the Lie algebra before proceeding.) To see how this works, consider the case G = SL(n, R). We can take the group of diagonal matrices diag(t_{1}, ..., t_{n}) as our maximal torus T. Conjugation by an element of T sends

$$\begin{bmatrix}
a_{11}&a_{12}&\cdots&a_{1n}\\
a_{21}&a_{22}&\cdots&a_{2n}\\
\vdots&\vdots&\ddots&\vdots\\
a_{n1}&a_{n2}&\cdots&a_{nn}\\
\end{bmatrix}
\mapsto
\begin{bmatrix}
a_{11}&t_1t_2^{-1}a_{12}&\cdots&t_1t_n^{-1}a_{1n}\\
t_2t_1^{-1}a_{21}&a_{22}&\cdots&t_2t_n^{-1}a_{2n}\\
\vdots&\vdots&\ddots&\vdots\\
t_nt_1^{-1}a_{n1}&t_nt_2^{-1}a_{n2}&\cdots&a_{nn}\\
\end{bmatrix}.$$

Thus, T acts trivially on the diagonal part of the Lie algebra of G and with eigenvectors t_{i}t_{j}^{−1} on the various off-diagonal entries. The roots of G are the weights diag(t_{1}, ..., t_{n}) → t_{i}t_{j}^{−1}. This accounts for the standard description of the root system of G = SL_{n}(R) as the set of vectors of the form e_{i}−e_{j}.

=== Example SL(2, R) ===
When computing the root system for one of the simplest cases of Lie Groups, the group SL(2, R) of two dimensional matrices with determinant 1 consists of the set of matrices of the form:

$$\begin{bmatrix}
a & b\\
c & d\\
\end{bmatrix}$$

with a, b, c, d real and ad − bc = 1.

A maximal compact connected abelian Lie subgroup, or maximal torus T, is given by the subset of all matrices of the form

$$\begin{bmatrix}
t_1 & 0\\
0 & t_2\\
\end{bmatrix}
=
\begin{bmatrix}
t_1 & 0\\
0 & 1/t_1\\
\end{bmatrix}
=
\begin{bmatrix}
\exp(\theta) & 0 \\
0 & \exp(-\theta) \\
\end{bmatrix}$$

with $t_1 t_2 = 1$. The Lie algebra of the maximal torus is the Cartan subalgebra consisting of the matrices

$$\begin{bmatrix}
\theta & 0\\
0 & -\theta \\
\end{bmatrix} =
\theta\begin{bmatrix}
1 & 0\\
0 & 0 \\
\end{bmatrix}-\theta\begin{bmatrix}
0 & 0\\
0 & 1 \\
\end{bmatrix}
= \theta(e_1-e_2).$$

If we conjugate an element of SL(2, R) by an element of the maximal torus we obtain

$$\begin{bmatrix}
t_1 & 0\\
0 & 1/t_1\\
\end{bmatrix}
\begin{bmatrix}
a & b\\
c & d\\
\end{bmatrix}
\begin{bmatrix}
1/t_1 & 0\\
0 & t_1\\
\end{bmatrix}
=
\begin{bmatrix}
a t_1 & b t_1 \\
c / t_1 & d / t_1\\
\end{bmatrix}
\begin{bmatrix}
1 / t_1 & 0\\
0       & t_1\\
\end{bmatrix}
=
\begin{bmatrix}
a       & b t_1^2\\
c t_1^{-2} & d\\
\end{bmatrix}$$

The matrices

$$\begin{bmatrix}
1 & 0\\
0 & 0\\
\end{bmatrix}
\begin{bmatrix}
0 & 0\\
0 & 1\\
\end{bmatrix}
\begin{bmatrix}
0 & 1\\
0 & 0\\
\end{bmatrix}
\begin{bmatrix}
0 & 0\\
1 & 0\\
\end{bmatrix}$$

are then 'eigenvectors' of the conjugation operation with eigenvalues $1,1,t_1^2, t_1^{-2}$. The function Λ which gives $t_1^2$ is a multiplicative character, or homomorphism from the group's torus to the underlying field R. The function λ giving θ is a weight of the Lie Algebra with weight space given by the span of the matrices.

It is satisfying to show the multiplicativity of the character and the linearity of the weight. It can further be proved that the differential of Λ can be used to create a weight. It is also educational to consider the case of SL(3, R).

== Variants and analogues ==
The adjoint representation can also be defined for algebraic groups over any field.

The co-adjoint representation is the contragredient representation of the adjoint representation. Alexandre Kirillov observed that the orbit of any vector in a co-adjoint representation is a symplectic manifold. According to the philosophy in representation theory known as the orbit method (see also the Kirillov character formula), the irreducible representations of a Lie group G should be indexed in some way by its co-adjoint orbits. This relationship is closest in the case of nilpotent Lie groups.

== See also ==
- Adjoint bundle
