= Donaldson invariant =

In differential topology in mathematics, Donaldson invariants are invariants of the smooth structure of four-dimensional smooth manifolds (short 4-manifolds) based on the methods behind Donaldson's theorem. In particular, key informations are obtained from the Yang–Mills moduli space of the Yang–Mills equations on the 4-manifold, which as partial differential equations depend on the smooth structure. Donaldson invariants can distinguish these, hence are able to detect exotic smooth structures, meaning explicitly that homeomorphic smooth 4-manifolds, hence identical from a topological perspective, can nonetheless have different Donaldson invariants. Donaldson invariants are named after Simon Donaldson, who first described Donaldson's theorem in 1983 (with improvement in 1987) and the resulting invariants in 1986. He was also awarded a Fields Medal for his contributions in 1986.

== History ==
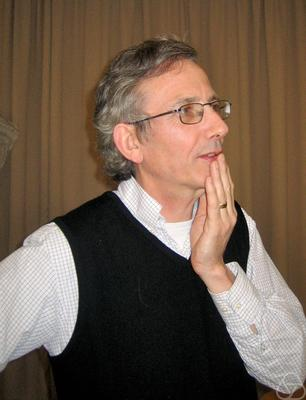
Simon Donaldson was awarded the Fields Medal in 1986 for the development of Donaldson theory

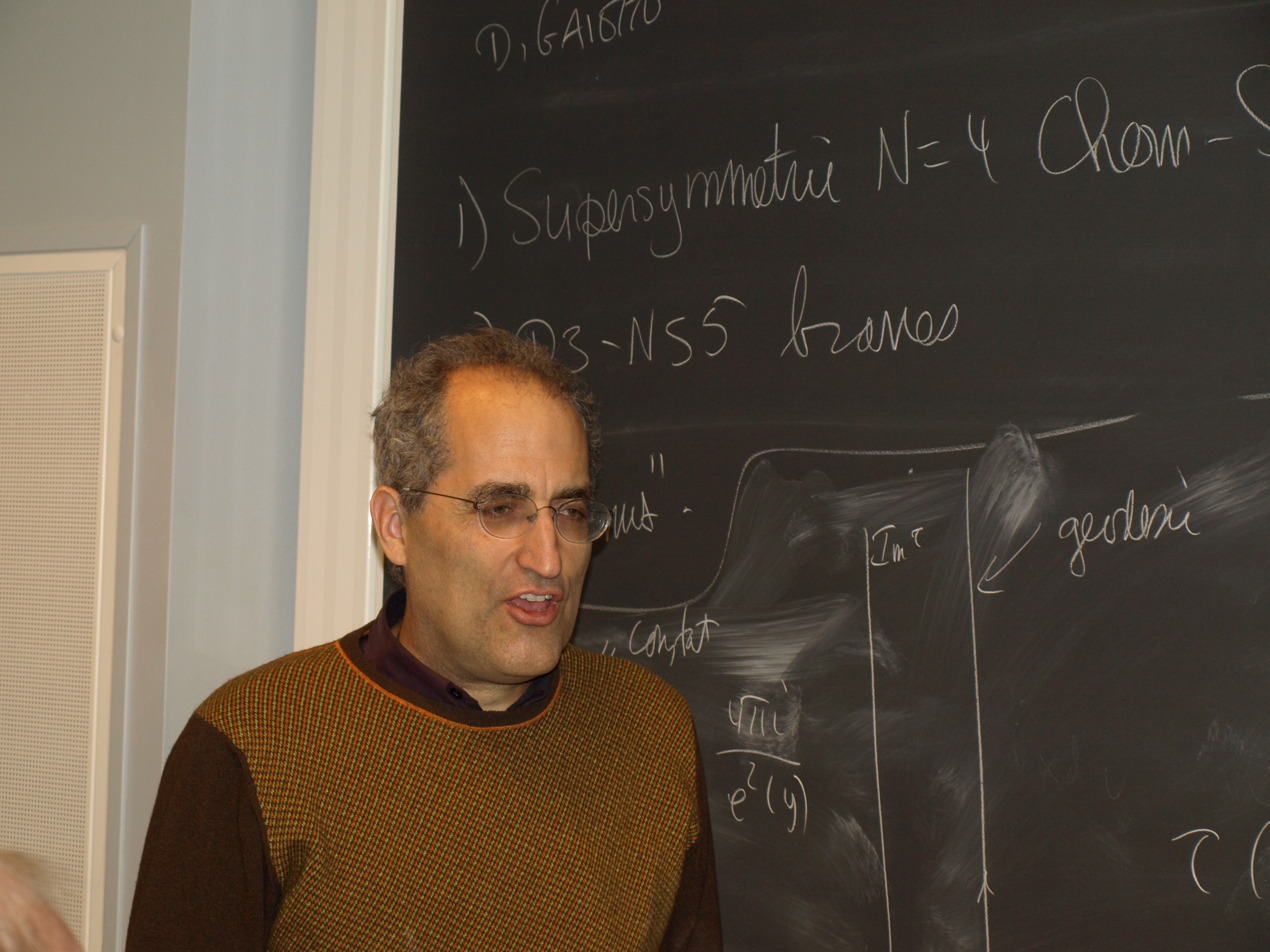
Edward Witten was awarded the Fields Medal in 1990 for the development of topological quantum field theories (TQFT)

In 1983 (with later improvement in 1987), Simon Donaldson proved Donaldson's theorem with the unexpected strategy of using the (anti) self-dual Yang–Mills moduli space ((A)SDYM moduli space) of principal SU(2)-bundles, hence with the special unitary group $\operatorname{SU}(2)$ as structure group. In 1984, Ronald Fintushel und Ronald Stern adapted his work to principal SO(3)-bundles, hence with the special orthogonal group $\operatorname{SO}(3)$ as structure group. Both groups are connected by a double cover $\operatorname{SU}(2)\twoheadrightarrow\operatorname{SO}(3)$, exactly the adjoint representation, alternatively phrased one has the third spin group $\operatorname{Spin}(3)\cong\operatorname{SU}(2)$ and the second projective unitary group $\operatorname{PU}(2)\cong\operatorname{SO}(3)$. In 1986, Simon Donaldson expanded his work into invariants about the smooth structure of smooth manifolds, which work with both structure groups $\operatorname{SU}(2)$ and $\operatorname{SO}(3)$. In 1988, Edward Witten opened up the field of topological quantum field theories (TQFT) and showed, that Donaldson invariants can be expressed as the expectation values of a topologically twisted N = 2 supersymmetric Yang-Mills theory (TT D = 4 N = 2 SYM).

In early 1994, Peter Kronheimer and Tomasz Mrowka achieved a strong simplification of Donaldson invariants with the introduction of Kronheimer–Mrowka basic classes, which reduced its infinite sums to finite sums. In late 1994, Nathan Seiberg and Edward Witten constructed the dual TT N = 2 SYM. Both this gauge theory as well as its application to four-dimensional geometry are often referred to as Seiberg–Witten theory, but strictly speaking are two different theories. Seiberg–Witten invariants brought multiple improvements over Donaldson invariants, mainly due to the easier and furthermore abelian unitary group $\operatorname{U}(1)$ as structure group or the always compact Seiberg–Witten moduli space, with made laborious compactifications using Uhlenbeck's compactness theorem required for Donaldson invariants obsolete. Despite that, it could be shown in the following years that Seiberg–Witten invariants still contain more information than Donaldson invariants, so the latter are not used as actively any more. In particular, Clifford Taubes described a connection to Gromov–Witten invariants and Edward Witten concluded from purely physical arguments the Witten conjecture, that Kronheimer–Mrowka basic classes and therefore Donaldson invariants can be fully obtained from Seiberg–Witten theory.

By now, also topologically twisted four-dimensional N = 4 supersymmetric Yang–Mills theories (TT D = 4 N = 4 SYM) are considered, including Donaldson–Witten theory, Vafa–Witten theory and Kapustin–Witten theory, with other variants like three-dimensional Rozansky–Witten theory. From these, further invariants like Vafa–Witten invariants and Rozansky–Witten invariants arise, with current research trying to determine how they expand and improve the original idea of Donaldson invariants.

== SU(2) Donaldson invariants ==
Let $X$ be an oriented closed smooth 4-manifold and $P\twoheadrightarrow X$ be a principal SU(2)-bundle, then there exists a unique homotopy class represented by a classifying map $\tau\colon X\rightarrow\operatorname{BSU}(2)\cong\mathbb{H}P^\infty$ into the classifying space for SU(2) giving a pullback $P=\tau^*\operatorname{ESU}(2)=\tau^*S^\infty$. With the Kronecker pairing and the fundamental class $[X]\in H_4(X,\mathbb{Z})$ from the orientation, the second Chern class concretely gives a group isomorphism:

$$\langle c_2(-),[X]\rangle\colon
\operatorname{Prin}_{\operatorname{SU}(2)}(X)\xrightarrow\cong\mathbb{Z}.$$

Let $\mathcal{A}:=\Omega_{\operatorname{Ad}}^1(P,\mathfrak{su}(2))$ be the configuration space of connections on $P$, which is an affine vector space not canonically isomorphic to $\Omega^1(X,\operatorname{Ad}(P))$. Let $\mathcal{G}:=\operatorname{Aut}_{\operatorname{SU}(2)}(P)$ be the gauge group of gauge transformations of $P$, which acts on $\mathcal{A}$. Let $\mathcal{B}:=\mathcal{A}/\mathcal{G}$ be the orbit space, then there is a weak homotopy equivalence $\mathcal{B}\rightarrow\operatorname{Map}_P(X,\operatorname{BSU}(2))$ in the homotopy class of the classifying map of $P$. Currying it corresponds to a map $\mathcal{B}\times X\rightarrow\operatorname{BSU}(2)$ and through pullback a principal $\operatorname{SU}(2)$-bundle $\widetilde{P}\twoheadrightarrow\mathcal{B}\times X$. For every gauge class $[A]\in\mathcal{B}$, one has $\widetilde{P}\vert_{\{[A]\}\times X}\cong P\twoheadrightarrow X$. With the second Chern class $c_2(\widetilde{P})\in H^4(\mathcal{B}\times X,\mathbb{Z})$, the slant product yields a map:

$$\mu\colon
H_2(X,\mathbb{Z})\rightarrow H^2(\mathcal{B},\mathbb{Z}),
\mu(\alpha):=c_2(\widetilde{P})/\alpha.$$

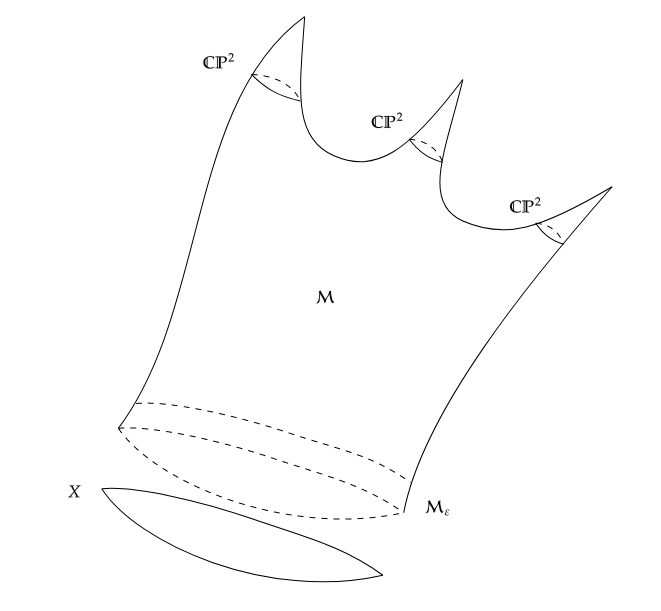
Visualization of the five-dimensional self-dual Yang–Mills moduli space from the proof of Donaldson's theorem

With the subset $\mathcal{M}\subset\mathcal{B}$ of an (anti) self-dual Yang–Mills moduli space there is an induced map $H^2(\mathcal{B},\mathbb{Z})\hookrightarrow H^2(\mathcal{M},\mathbb{Z})$, which through postcomposition yields a map $\mu\colon H_2(X,\mathbb{Z})\rightarrow H^2(\mathcal{M},\mathbb{Z})$. With the interpretation of the homology classes as embedded surfaces $i\colon\Sigma\hookrightarrow M$ with $i_*[\Sigma]\in H_2(M,\mathbb{Z})$ and the interpretation of the cohomology classes as differential forms of second order using de Rham cohomology $H^2(\mathcal{M},\mathbb{R})\cong H_\mathrm{dR}^2(\mathcal{M})$, one can see the map $\mu$ as mapping embedded surfaces in $M$ to differential forms of second order in $\mathcal{M}$. Donaldson invariants are defined using the integration of these differential forms, which is disrupted by the missing compatness and the singularities of the moduli space. A compactification $\mathcal{M}\subset\overline\mathcal{M}$ can be constructed using Uhlenbeck's compactness theorem and leads to a $\mathbb{Z}$-linear map $\mu\colon H_2(X,\mathbb{Z})\rightarrow H^2(\overline\mathcal{M},\mathbb{Z})$.

Let $P_k\twoheadrightarrow X$ be the unique principal $\operatorname{SU}(2)$-bundle with $\langle c_2(P_k),[X]\rangle=k$ according to the above group isomorphism, then $\langle p_1\operatorname{Ad}(P_k),[X]\rangle=-4k$ for the first Pontrjagin class of the adjoint vector bundle and the virtual dimension of its anti self-dual Yang–Mills (ASDYM) moduli space is given with the Atiyah–Singer index theorem by:

$$\dim\mathcal{M}_k
=-8k-3(1-b_1(M)+b_2^+(M)).$$

If $-b_1(M)+b_2^+(M)$ is odd, then the virtual dimension is an even number $\dim\mathcal{M}_k =2d_k$, potentially negative given the choice of $k$. With a fundamental class $\left[\mathcal{M}_k\right]\in H_{2d_k}(\mathcal{M}_k,\mathbb{Z}) \cong\mathbb{Z}^{b_0\left(\mathcal{M}_k\right)}$ since the ASDYM moduli space is orientable, the Donaldson invariant is given with the cup product and the Kronecker pairing:

$$\mathcal{D}_{X,k}\colon
\operatorname{Sym}^{d_k}H_2(X,\mathbb{Z})\rightarrow\mathbb{Z},
\mathcal{D}_{X,k}(\alpha_1,\ldots,\alpha_{d_k}):=\left\langle\mu(\alpha_1)\smile\ldots\smile\mu(\alpha_{d_k}), \left[\mathcal{M}_k\right]\right\rangle.$$

Considering the second homology classes in a symmetric setting only up to permutation comes from the symmetry of the cup product, hence the irrelevance of any order. It can furthermore be shown, that the Donaldson invariants also don't depend on the Riemannian metric and therefore only on the smooth structure.

== Change of instanton number ==
According to the above formula, $\dim\mathcal{M}_{k+1}=\dim\mathcal{M}_k+8$ holds under a change of the instanton number, expanding the input of the Donaldson invariant by four new second homology classes. More generally, the slant product yields a $\mathbb{Z}$-linear map $\mu\colon H_n(X,\mathbb{Z})\rightarrow H^{4-n}(\overline\mathcal{M},\mathbb{Z})$, so for $X$ connected with $H_0(X,\mathbb{Z})\cong\mathbb{Z}$ a map $\mu\colon\mathbb{Z}\rightarrow H^4(\overline\mathcal{M},\mathbb{Z})$. Hence one can also expand the Donaldson invariant by two images of a generator.

== SO(3) Donaldson invariants ==
Let $P\twoheadrightarrow X$ be a principal SO(3)-bundle, then there exists a unique homotopy class represented by a classifying map $\tau\colon X\rightarrow\operatorname{BSO}(3)$ into the classifying space for SO(3) giving a pullback $P=\tau^*\operatorname{ESO}(3)$. Now the second Stiefel–Whitney class and the first Pontrjagin class give a group isomorphism:

$$(w_2,\langle p_1(-),[X]\rangle)\colon
\operatorname{Prin}_{\operatorname{SO}(3)}(X)\xrightarrow\cong\{(v,n)\in H^2(X,\mathbb{Z}_2)\times\mathbb{Z}|\langle v^2,[X]\rangle\equiv n\operatorname{mod}4\}.$$

In this case, the first Pontrjagin class replaces the second Chern class in the slant product.

== Donaldson invariants of compactification ==
=== Compactification to two dimensions ===
According to the classification of surfaces, every oriented closed 2-manifold (surface) is homeomorphic to a Sigma surface $\Sigma_g=\# gT^2$, given as a connected sum of 2-tori $T^2=S^1\times S^1$ with the convention $\Sigma_0=S^2$. Now the Donaldson invariants can be considered on the 4-manifold $\Sigma_g\times S^2$.

=== Compactification to three dimensions ===
For an oriented closed 3-manifold $Y$, one can consider the Donaldson invariants on the 4-manifold $Y\times S^1$. For general structure groups, they relate to the Rozansky–Witten invariants of $Y$ and for the structure group $\operatorname{SU}(2)$, they relate to the Casson–Walker–Lescop invariant of $Y$.

== Literature ==
- Donaldson, Simon (1986). "Connections, cohomology and the intersection forms of 4-manifolds". Journal of Differential Geometry. 24 (3): 275–341. doi:10.4310/jdg/1214440551. ISSN 0022-040X. MR 0679066.
- Freed, Daniel; Uhlenbeck, Karen (1991). Instantons and Four-Manifolds. Mathematical Sciences Research Institute Publications. Vol. 1. Cambridge University Press. ISBN 978-1-4613-9705-2.
- Donaldson, Simon K.; Kronheimer, Peter B. (1990-09-13). The Geometry of Four-Manifolds. Oxford Mathematical Monographs. Oxford University Press. doi:10.1093/oso/9780198535539.001.0001. ISBN 978-0-198-53553-9. MR 1079726.
- Scorpan, Alexandru (2005). The Wild World of 4-Manifolds. Mathematical Sciences Research Institute Publications. Vol. 1. American Mathematical Society. ISBN 978-1-4704-6861-3.
- Naber, Gregory L. (2011). Topology, Geometry and Gauge Fields. Applied Mathematical Sciences. Vol. 141 (Second ed.). Springer. doi:10.1007/978-1-4419-7895-0. ISBN 978-1-4419-7894-3. ISSN 0066-5452.
- Salamon, Dietmar (1999). Spin Geometry and Seiberg-Witten invariants (PDF).
