= Yang–Mills moduli space =

Moduli space of the Yang–Mills equations

In gauge theory, the Yang–Mills moduli space (short YM moduli space, also instanton moduli space) is the moduli space of the Yang–Mills equations, hence the space of its solutions up to gauge. It is used in Donaldson's theorem, proven in (Donaldson 1983) and improved in (Donaldson 1987), which was listed as a contribution for Simon Donaldson winning the Fields Medal in 1986, and to defined the Donaldson invariants used to study four-dimensional smooth manifolds (short 4-manifolds). A difficulty is, that the Yang–Mills moduli space is usually not compact and has to be compactified around singularities through laborious techniques. An improvement later appeared with the always compact Seiberg–Witten moduli space. The Yang–Mills moduli space is named after Chen-Ning Yang and Robert Mills, who introduced the underlying Yang–Mills equations in 1954.

In four dimensions, see also four-dimensional Yang–Mills theory, important subspaces of the Yang-Mills moduli space are the self-dual Yang-Mills moduli space (short SDYM moduli space, also self-dual instanton moduli space) of solutions of the self-dual Yang-Mills equations up to gauge and the anti self-dual Yang-Mills moduli space (short ASDYM moduli space, also anti self-dual instanton moduli space) of solutions of the anti self-dual Yang-Mills equations up to gauge.

== Definition ==
Let $G$ be a Lie group with Lie algebra $\mathfrak{g}$ and $\pi\colon P\twoheadrightarrow X$ be a principal $G$-bundle over a smooth manifold $X$, which automatically makes $P$ a smooth manifold as well. Let $\operatorname{Ad}(P):=P\times_G\mathfrak{g}$ be the adjoint bundle, then the Yang–Mills equations as well as the (anti) self-dual Yang–Mills equations are formulated on the configuration space:

$$\mathcal{A}
=\Omega^1(X,\operatorname{Ad}(P))
\cong\Omega_{\operatorname{Ad}}^1(P,\mathfrak{g})$$

where the isomorphism requires a choice of local sections $s_i\colon U_i\hookrightarrow P$ for an open cover $(U_i)_{i\in I}\subset X$ (or alternatively a connection since the latter space is an affine vector space, which makes the isomorphism non-canonical) and is then given by:

$$\Omega_{\operatorname{Ad}}^1(P,\mathfrak{g})\xrightarrow\cong\Omega^1(X,\operatorname{Ad}(P)),
A\mapsto(s_i^*A)_{i\in I}.$$

Since the configuration space is an infinite-dimensional vector space, it is more difficult to handle. But also due to the group action on the principal bundle, it is plausible to consider a group action on the configuration space with the following gauge group:

$$\mathcal{G}
:= C^\infty(P,G)^G
\cong C^\infty(X,G)
\cong\operatorname{Aut}(P)$$

where the isomorphisms are given using the free and transitive action of $G$ on the fibers of $P$ (with $G$ as a superscript meaning the $G$-equivariant maps and which are canonical):

$$C^\infty(X,G)\xrightarrow\cong\operatorname{Aut}(P),
f\mapsto(p\mapsto p\cdot f(\pi(p)));$$
$$C^\infty(P,G)^G\xrightarrow\cong\operatorname{Aut}(P),
f\mapsto(p\mapsto p\cdot f(p)).$$

A principal bundle automorphism $P\rightarrow P$ induces a vector bundle automorphism $\operatorname{Ad}(P)\rightarrow\operatorname{Ad}(P)$, causing the gauge group $\mathcal{G}$ to act free on the configuration space $\mathcal{A}$ and resulting in the orbit space:

$$\mathcal{B}
:=\mathcal{A}/\mathcal{G}.$$

It can be shown that the Yang–Mills equations are gauge invariant and hence are formulated over just this orbit space. Its solution form the Yang–Mills moduli space:

$$\mathcal{M}_P
:=\{[A]\in\mathcal{B}|\mathrm{d}_A\star F_A=0\}.$$

If $X$ is a 4-manifold, then four-dimensional Yang–Mills theory furthermore allows the definition of the (anti) self-dual Yang–Mills moduli space:

$$\mathcal{M}_P^\mathrm{ASD}
:=\{[A]\in\mathcal{B}|\star F_A=-F_A\};$$
$$\mathcal{M}_P^\mathrm{SD}
:=\{[A]\in\mathcal{B}|\star F_A=+F_A\}.$$

(While notations like $\mathcal{M}_P^-$ or $\mathcal{M}_P^+$ can also be used, it can be confusing as the (anti) self-dual Yang–Mills equations $\star F_A=\pm F_A$ can also be written as $F_A^\mp=0$ with the sign in the notation reversed.) There are canonical inclusions $\mathcal{M}_P^\mathrm{ASD},\mathcal{M}_P^\mathrm{SD}\hookrightarrow\mathcal{M}_P^+$. The intersection $\mathcal{M}_P^\mathrm{ASD}\cap\mathcal{M}_P^\mathrm{SD}$ includes exactly the flat connections, the critical points of the Chern–Simons action functional, and could therefore be referred to as Chern–Simons moduli space.

== Properties ==
- The anti self-dual Yang–Mills moduli space of a principal SU(2)-bundle over a Riemannian 4-manifold is orientable. This more generally holds for principal $\operatorname{SU}(n)$-bundles.
- The self-dual Yang–Mills moduli space of a principal $\operatorname{SO}(3)$-bundle $P\twoheadrightarrow X$ with $p_2(P)[X]\leq 3$ over a compact orientable Riemannian 4-manifold $X$ is compact.
- If $X$ is a 4-manifold, then:

$$\dim\mathcal{M}_P^\mathrm{SD}
=2p_1(\operatorname{Ad}(P))[X]
-\dim G(1-b_1+b_2^-).$$

- In particular for $G=\operatorname{SU}(2)$ the second special unitary group:

$$\dim\mathcal{M}_P^\mathrm{SD}
=-8c_2(P)[X]
-3(1-b_1+b_2^-).$$

- In particular for $G=\operatorname{SO}(3)$ the third special orthogonal group:

$$\dim\mathcal{M}_P^\mathrm{SD}
=2p_1(P)[X]
-3(1-b_1+b_2^-).$$

It is important to consider the different sign conventions regarding the characteristic classes in the first term: Instantons and Four-Manifolds uses the convention here, while the later The Geometry of Four-Manifolds uses the reverse convention.

== Application ==
=== Self-dual SU(2) moduli space ===
For the proof of Donaldson's theorem, Simon Donaldson considered the self-dual Yang–Mills moduli space $\mathcal{M}_P^\mathrm{SD}$ of the unique principal SU(2)-bundle $P\twoheadrightarrow X$ with $c_2(P)[X]=-1$ over a simply connected Riemannian 4-manifold $X$ with negative definite intersection form $\omega$. (Over the 4-sphere $S^4$, this would be the quaternionic Hopf fibration $S^7\twoheadrightarrow S^4$.) After first assuming simple connectedness for $b_1(X)=0$ in (Donaldson 1983), he expanded the proof to also work without it in (Donaldson 1987). If the intersection form $\omega$ is definite, then furthermore $b_2^+(X)=0$. According to the above formula, the self-dual Yang–Mills moduli space $\mathcal{M}_P^\mathrm{SD}$ is five-dimensional. Simon Donaldson then gave the following description of its singularities and its boundary, resulting in a bordism essential for his proof:

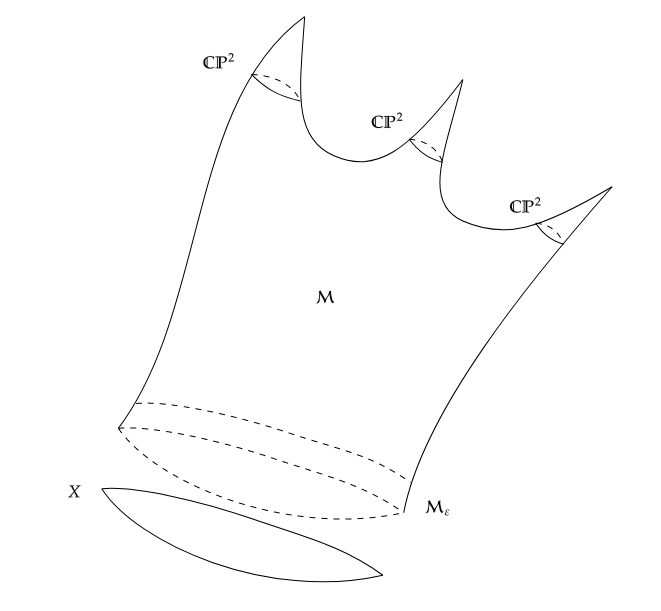
Visualization of the Yang–Mills moduli space used in the proof of Donaldson's theorem

- If there are $n$ pairs $\pm\alpha\in H^2(X,\mathbb{Z})$ to the equation $\omega(\alpha,\alpha)=\langle\alpha^2,[X]\rangle=1$ with the Kronecker pairing and fundamental class, then there are $n$ singularities $x_1,\ldots,x_n\in\mathcal{M}_P^+$, so that $\mathcal{M}_P^\mathrm{SD}\setminus\{x_1,\ldots,x_n\}$ is a 5-manifold. Every such singularity $x_i\in\mathcal{M}_P^\mathrm{SD}$ has a neighborhood $U_i\subset\mathcal{M}_P^\mathrm{SD}$ diffeomorphic to a cone over the second complex projective space $\mathbb{C}P^2$ (whose tip corresponds to the singularity).
- There exists a neighborhood of the boundary $\partial\mathcal{M}_P^\mathrm{SD}$ which is diffeomorphic to a half-open cylinder over $X$, meaning that $\overline\mathcal{M}_P^\mathrm{SD} :=\mathcal{M}_P^\mathrm{SD}\cup X$ yields a compactification with $\partial\overline\mathcal{M}_P^\mathrm{SD} =X$. (A similar approach also works for other negative Chern classes (or positive in the convention of The Geometry of Four-Manifolds).) If additionally the cones around the singularities are removed, then $\overline\mathcal{M}_P^\mathrm{SD}\setminus(U_1\cup\ldots\cup U_n)$ describes a bordism between $X$ and $(\mathbb{C}P^2)^{\sqcup n}$. It is important, that all second complex projective spaces have the same orientation, since $\mathbb{C}P^2\sqcup\overline{\mathbb{C}P^2}$ is nullbordant (as the boundary the 5-manifold $\mathbb{C}P^2\times[0,1]$) and hence could be canceled out. Since the signature is invariant under bordisms and transfers disjoint unions into sums, one has $\sigma(X) =n\sigma(\mathbb{C}P^2) =n$.

=== Self-dual SO(3) moduli space ===
Ron Fintushel and Ronald J. Stern considered the self-dual Yang–Mills moduli space $\mathcal{M}_P^\mathrm{SD}$ of a principal $\operatorname{SO}(3)$-bundle $P\twoheadrightarrow X$ with $p_2(P)[X]=2$ over a simply connected Riemannian 4-manifold $X$ with negative definite intersection form $\omega$. As before, $b_1(X)=0$ and $b_1(X)=0$. According to the above formula, the self-dual Yang–Mills moduli space $\mathcal{M}_P^\mathrm{SD}$ is one-dimensional.

== Literature ==
- Donaldson, S. K. (1983), "An application of gauge theory to four-dimensional topology", Journal of Differential Geometry, 18 (2): 279–315, doi:10.4310/jdg/1214437665, MR 0710056, Zbl 0507.57010
- Donaldson, Simon (1987). "The orientation of Yang-Mills moduli spaces and 4-manifold topology". Journal of Differential Geometry. 26 (3). doi:10.4310/jdg/1214441485.
- Uhlenbeck, Karen K.; Freed, Daniel S. (1984). Instantons and Four-Manifolds. Mathematical Sciences Research Institute Publications. Vol. 1. Springer. doi:10.1007/978-1-4613-9703-8. ISBN 978-1-4613-9703-8.
- Donaldson, Simon K.; Kronheimer, Peter B. (1990-09-13). The Geometry of Four-Manifolds. Oxford Mathematical Monographs. Oxford University Press. doi:10.1093/oso/9780198535539.001.0001. ISBN 978-0-198-53553-9. MR 1079726.
- Naber, Gregory L. (2011). Topology, Geometry and Gauge Fields. Applied Mathematical Sciences. Vol. 141 (Second ed.). Springer. doi:10.1007/978-1-4419-7895-0. ISBN 978-1-4419-7894-3. ISSN 0066-5452.
