= Instantons and Four-Manifolds =

Mathematics textbook

- Author: Daniel Freed and Karen Uhlenbeck
- Language: English
- Series: Mathematical Sciences Research Institute Publications
- Publisher: Springer
- Publication date: 1984
- ISBN: 978-1-4613-9703-8

Instantons and Four-Manifolds is a mathematical textbook about Yang–Mills theory, or more generally gauge theory, and its application to the study of the geometry and topology of smooth 4-manifolds as described by Donaldson theory. It is considered a standard work for this topic. It was written by Daniel Freed and Karen Uhlenbeck, who received the Abel Prize in 2019 for her work in the field. It was published in 1984 with a second revised edition in 1991.

== Content ==
Instantons and Four-Manifolds begins with a dense collection of the most important constructions and results of the field, which are about the intersection form and signature as well as smooth structures and Donaldson invariants. Afterwards, 4-manifolds are examined closer under the topological and smooth perspective as well as the Yang–Mills equations from mathematical perspective. In the rest of the textbook, the works of Simon Donaldson about the self-dual SU(2) Yang–Mills moduli space and Donaldson's theorem, which earned him a Fields Medal in 1986, Clifford Taubes about Taubes' theorem as well as Ron Fintushel and Ronald J. Stern about the self-dual SO(3) Yang–Mills moduli space are explained.

== Background ==
After the publication of Donaldson's theorem, Karen Uhlenbeck and Michael Freedman, who just like Simon Donaldson was awarded the Fields Medal in 1986 for his contributions, gave a seminar to rigorously work through it. Daniel Freed was responsible for taking notes. Although the seminar was well visited, within three months there was no significant progress in understanding, which caused the development of a textbook. ("Unfortnutely, we found after three months that we had covered most of the published material but had made little progress toward giving a complete, detailed proof.") Central were all analytical considerations, which are the core of Donaldson's original publications, but aren't described in deep details. ("The seminar bogged down in the hard analysis, which also takes up most of Donaldson's paper (in less detail).")

== Reviews ==
Ronald J. Stern wrote, "this book exposes the beautiful confluence of deep techniques and ideas from mathematical physics and the topological study of the differential study of compact four-dimensional manifolds". Furthermore, "this work is in sharp contrast to the earlier remarkable results of Michael Freedman".

Thomas Parker wrote, the textbook "is a timely and detailled exposition of perhaps the most remarkable product of this [between physics and differential geometry] interaction".

== See also ==
- The Geometry of Four-Manifolds (1990), mathematical textbook about the same topics

== Literature ==
- Uhlenbeck, Karen K.; Freed, Daniel S. (1984). Instantons and Four-Manifolds. Mathematical Sciences Research Institute Publications. Vol. 1. Springer. doi:10.1007/978-1-4613-9703-8. ISBN 978-1-4613-9703-8.
