= Pretzel knot =

A Pretzel knot may refer to:

- Pretzel link: a concept in mathematics
- Soft pretzel with garlic
- Stafford knot: a rope knot used in sailing and heraldry
