= Principal SU(2)-bundle =

Special type of principal bundle

In mathematics, especially differential geometry, principal $\operatorname{SU}(2)$-bundles (or principal $\operatorname{Sp}(1)$-bundles) are special principal bundles with the second special unitary group $\operatorname{SU}(2)$ (isomorphic to the first symplectic group $\operatorname{Sp}(1)$) as structure group. Topologically, it has the structure of the three-dimensional sphere, hence principal $\operatorname{SU}(2)$-bundles without their group action are in particular sphere bundles. These are basically topological spaces with a sphere glued to every point, so that all of them are connected with each other, but globally aren't necessarily a product and can instead be twisted like a Möbius strip.

Principal $\operatorname{SU}(2)$-bundles are used in many areas of mathematics, for example for the Fields Medal winning proof of Donaldson's theorem or instanton Floer homology. Since $\operatorname{SU}(2)$ is the gauge group of the weak interaction, principal $\operatorname{SU}(2)$-bundles are also of interest in theoretical physics. In particular, principal $\operatorname{SU}(2)$-bundles over the four-dimensional sphere $S^4$, which include the quaternionic Hopf fibration, can be used to describe hypothetical magnetic monopoles in five dimensions, known as Wu–Yang monopoles, see also four-dimensional Yang–Mills theory.

== Definition ==
Principal $\operatorname{SU}(2)$-bundles are generalizations of canonical projections $B\times\operatorname{SU}(2)\twoheadrightarrow B$ for topological spaces $B$, so that the source is not globally a product but only locally. More concretely, a continuous map $p\colon E\twoheadrightarrow B$ with a continuous right group action $E\times\operatorname{SU}(2)\rightarrow E$, which preserves all preimages of points, hence $p(eg)=p(e)$ for all $e\in E$ and $g \in \operatorname{SU}(2)$, and also acts free and transitive on all preimages of points, which makes all of them homeomorphic to $\operatorname{SU}(2)$, is a principal $\operatorname{SU}(2)$-bundle.

Since principal bundles are in particular fiber bundles with the group action missing, their nomenclature can be transferred. $E$ is also called the total space and $B$ is also called the base space. Preimages of points are then the fibers. Since $\operatorname{SU}(2)$ is a Lie group, hence in particular a smooth manifold, the base space $B$ is often chosen to be a smooth manifold as well since this automatically makes the total space $E$ into a smooth manifold as well.

== Classification ==
Principal $\operatorname{SU}(2)$-bundles can be fully classified using the classifying space $\operatorname{BSU}(2)$ of the second special unitary group $\operatorname{SU}(2)$, which is exactly the infinite quaternionic projective space $\mathbb{H}P^\infty$. For a topological space $B$, let $\operatorname{Prin}_{\operatorname{SU}(2)}(B)$ denote the set of equivalence classes of principal $\operatorname{SU}(2)$-bundles over it, then there is a bijection with homotopy classes:

$$\operatorname{Prin}_{\operatorname{SU}(2)}(B)
\cong[B,\operatorname{BSU}(2)]
\cong[B,\mathbb{H}P^\infty].$$

$\mathbb{H}P^\infty$ is a CW complex with its $n$-skeleton being $\mathbb{H}P^k$ for the largest natural number $k\in\mathbb{N}$ with $4k\leq n$. For a $n$-dimensional CW complex $B$, the cellular approximation theorem states that every continuous map $B\rightarrow\mathbb{H}P^\infty$ is homotopic to a cellular map factoring over the canonical inclusion $\mathbb{H}P^k\hookrightarrow\mathbb{H}P^\infty$. As a result, the induced map $[B,\mathbb{H}P^k]\hookrightarrow[B,\mathbb{H}P^\infty]$ is surjective, but not necessarily injective as higher cells of $\mathbb{H}P^\infty$ allow additional homotopies. In particular if $B$ is a CW complex of seven or less dimensions, then $k=1$ and with $\mathbb{H}P^1 \cong S^4$, there is a connection to cohomotopy sets with a surjective map:

$$\pi^4(B)\rightarrow\operatorname{Prin}_{\operatorname{SU}(2)}(B).$$

If $B$ is a 4-manifold, then injectivity and therefore bijectivity holds since all homotopies can be shifted into the $5$-skeleton $S^4$ of $\mathbb{H}P^\infty$. If $B$ is a 5-manifold, this is no longer holds due to possible torsion in cohomology.

$\mathbb{H}P^\infty$ is the rationalized Eilenberg–MacLane space $K(\mathbb{Z},4)_\mathbb{Q}$ under rationalization, but itself not the Eilenberg–MacLane space $K(\mathbb{Z},4)$, which represents singular cohomology, compare to Brown's representability theorem. But from the Postnikov tower, there is a canonical map $\mathbb{H}P^\infty\rightarrow K(\mathbb{Z},4)$ and therefore by postcomposition a canonical map:

$$\operatorname{Prin}_{\operatorname{SU}(2)}(B)
\rightarrow H^4(B,\mathbb{Z}).$$

(The composition $\pi^4(B)\rightarrow H^4(B,\mathbb{Z})$ is the Hurewicz map.) A corresponding map is given by the second Chern class. If $B$ is again a 4-manifold, then the classification is unique. Although characteristic classes are defined for vector bundles, it is possible to also define them for certain principal bundles.

== Associated vector bundle ==
Given a principal $\operatorname{SU}(2)$-bundle $E\twoheadrightarrow B$, there is an associated vector bundle $E\times_{\operatorname{SU}(2)}\C^2\twoheadrightarrow B$. Intuitively, the spheres at every point are filled over the canonical inclusions $\operatorname{SU}(2)\subset\mathbb{C}^2$.

Since the determinant is constant on special unitary matrices, the determinant line bundle of this vector bundle is classified by a constant map and hence trivial. Since the determinant preserves the first Chern class, it is always trivial. Therefore the vector bundle is only described by the second Chern class $c_2\colon\operatorname{Vect}_\mathbb{C}(B)\rightarrow H^4(B,\mathbb{Z})$.

Since there is a canonical inclusion $\operatorname{U}(1)\hookrightarrow\operatorname{SU}(2),z\mapsto\operatorname{diag}(z,z^{-1})$, every principal $\operatorname{U}(1)$-bundle $E\twoheadrightarrow B$ can be associated a principal $\operatorname{SU}(2)$-bundle $\widehat{E}\twoheadrightarrow B$. If $L=E\times_{\operatorname{U}(1)}\mathbb{C}$ is the associated complex line bundle of $E$, then $L\oplus L^{-1} =\widehat{E}\times_{\operatorname{SU}(2)}\mathbb{C}^2$ is the associated complex plane bundle of $\widehat{E}$, exactly as claimed by the canonical inclusion. Hence the Chern classes of $\widehat{E}$ are given by:

$$c_1(\widehat{E})
=c_1(L\oplus L^{-1})
=c_1(L)
+c_1(L^{-1})
=0;$$
$$c_2(\widehat{E})
=c_2(L\oplus L^{-1})
=c_2(L)
+c_2(L^{-1})
+c_1(L)c_1(L^{-1})
=-c_1(L)^2
=-c_1(E)^2.$$

If $E\twoheadrightarrow B$ is a principal $\operatorname{SU}(2)$-bundle over a CW complex $B$ with $c_1(F)=0$ and $c_2(F)=-c^2$ for a singular cohomology class $c\in H^2(B,\mathbb{Z})$, then there exists a principal $\operatorname{U}(1)$-bundle $E\twoheadrightarrow B$ with $c_1(E)=c$ since the first Chern class of principal $\operatorname{U}(1)$-bundle over CW complexes is an isomorphism. Hence $\widehat{E}$ and $F$ have identical Chern classes. If $B$ is a 4-manifold, then both principal $\operatorname{SU}(2)$-bundles are isomorphic due to the unique classification by the second Chern class.

== Adjoint vector bundle ==
For the associated vector bundle, it is necessary that $\operatorname{SU}(2)$ is a matrix Lie group. But there is also the adjoint vector bundle, for which this is not necessary, since it uses the always existing adjoint representation $\operatorname{Ad}\colon \operatorname{SU}(2)\rightarrow\operatorname{Aut}(\mathfrak{su}(2))\cong\operatorname{SL}_3(\mathbb{R})$ with induced map $\mathcal{B}\operatorname{Ad}\colon \operatorname{BSU}(2)\rightarrow\operatorname{BSL}_3(\mathbb{R}) \cong\operatorname{BSO}(3)$. In fact, the adjoint representation is even the double cover $\operatorname{SU}(2)\cong\operatorname{Spin}(3)\rightarrow\operatorname{SO}(3)$. For a principal $\operatorname{SU}(2)$-bundle $E\twoheadrightarrow B$ with classifying map $f\colon B\rightarrow\operatorname{BSU}(2)$ with $E\cong f^*\operatorname{ESU}(2)$, the adjoint vector bundle is given by:

$$\operatorname{Ad}(E)
:=E\times_{\operatorname{SU}(2)}\mathfrak{su}(2)
=(\mathcal{B}\operatorname{Ad}\circ f)^*\gamma_\mathbb{R}^3$$

Since it has a spin structure as just described, its first and second Stiefel–Whitney classes vanish. Its first Pontrjagin class is given by:

$$p_1(\operatorname{Ad}(E))
=-4c_2(E)
\in H^4(B,\mathbb{Z}).$$

Unlike the associated vector bundle, a complex plane bundle, the adjoint vector bundle is a orientable real vector bundle of third rank. Also since $\operatorname{SU}(2)$ acts by simple multiplication on the former and by conjugation on the latter, the vector bundles can't be compared. An application of the adjoint vector bundle is on connections or more generally Lie algebra valued differential forms on the principal $\operatorname{SU}(2)$-bundle:

$$\Omega_{\operatorname{Ad}}^k(E,\mathfrak{su}(2))
\cong\Omega^k(B,\operatorname{Ad}(E))$$

== Examples ==
- By definition of quaternionic projective space, the canonical projection $S^{4n+3}\twoheadrightarrow\mathbb{H}P^n$is a principal $\operatorname{SU}(2)$-bundle. With $\mathbb{H}P^1\cong S^4$ the quaternionic Hopf fibration $h_\mathbb{H}\colon S^7\twoheadrightarrow S^4$ is a special case. For the general case, the classifying map is the canonical inclusion:

$$\mathbb{H}P^n\hookrightarrow\mathbb{H}P^\infty
\cong\operatorname{BSU}(2).$$

- One has $S^{2n+1} \cong\operatorname{SU}(n+1)/\operatorname{SU}(n)$, which means that there is a principal $\operatorname{SU}(2)$-bundle $\operatorname{SU}(3)\twoheadrightarrow S^5$. Such bundles are classified by:

$$\pi_5\operatorname{BSU}(2)
\cong\pi_4\operatorname{SU}(2)
\cong\pi_4S^3
\cong\mathbb{Z}_2.$$

$\operatorname{SU}(3)\twoheadrightarrow S^5$ is the non-trivial one, which can for example be detected by the fourth homotopy group:

$\pi_4\operatorname{SU}(3) \cong 1,$
$$\pi_4(S^5\times\operatorname{SU}(2))
\cong\pi_4(S^5)\times\pi_4(S^3)
\cong\mathbb{Z}_2.$$

- One has $S^{4n+3} \cong\operatorname{Sp}(n+1)/\operatorname{Sp}(n)$, which means that (using $\operatorname{SU}(2) \cong\operatorname{Sp}(1)$) there is a principal $\operatorname{SU}(2)$-bundle $\operatorname{Sp}(2)\twoheadrightarrow S^7$. Such bundles are classified by:

$$\pi_7\operatorname{BSU}(2)
\cong\pi_6\operatorname{SU}(2)
\cong\pi_6S^3
\cong\mathbb{Z}_{12}.$$

== See also ==
- Principal U(1)-bundle

== Literature ==
- Donaldson, Simon (1983). "An application of gauge theory to four-dimensional topology". Journal of Differential Geometry. 18 (2). doi:10.4310/jdg/1214437665.
- Donaldson, Simon (1987). "The orientation of Yang-Mills moduli spaces and 4-manifold topology". Journal of Differential Geometry. 26 (3). doi:10.4310/jdg/1214441485.
- Uhlenbeck, Karen K.; Freed, Daniel S. (1984). Instantons and Four-Manifolds. Mathematical Sciences Research Institute Publications. Vol. 1. Springer. doi:10.1007/978-1-4613-9703-8. ISBN 978-1-4613-9703-8.
- Hatcher, Allen (2001). Algebraic Topology. Cambridge University Press. ISBN 0-521-79160-X. Archived from the original on January 3, 2002.
- Mitchell, Stephen (2011). "Notes on principal bundles and classifying spaces" (PDF).
- Hatcher, Allen (2017). Vector Bundles and K-Theory (PDF).
