= Uhlenbeck's compactness theorem =

Compactness theorem in Yang–Mills theory

In differential geometry and in particular Yang–Mills theory, Uhlenbeck's compactness theorem is a result about sequences of (weak Yang–Mills) connections with uniformly bounded curvature having weakly or uniformly convergent subsequences up to gauge. It is an important theorem used in the compactification of the anti self-dual Yang–Mills moduli space (ASDYM moduli space), which is central to the construction of Donaldson invariants on four-dimensional manifolds (short 4-manifold) or monopole Floer homology on three-dimensional manifolds (short 3-manifold). The theorem is named after Karen Uhlenbeck, who first described it in 1982. In 2019, Uhlenbeck became the first woman to be awarded the Abel Prize, in part for her contributions to partial differential equations and gauge theory. Uhlenbeck's compactness theorem was generalized to Yang–Mills flows by Alex Waldron in 2018.

== Uhlenbeck's weak compactness theorem ==
Let $X$ be a $n$-dimensional compact Riemannian manifold and $P\twoheadrightarrow X$ be a principal $G$-bundle with a compact Lie group $G$. Let $1<p<\infty$ with $p>n/2$ and let $(A_m)_{m\in\mathbb{N}}\in\mathcal{A}^{1,p}(P) :=W^{1,p}(X,\operatorname{Ad}(P))\subset L^p(X,\operatorname{Ad}(P))$ be a sequence of Sobolev connections with uniform bound for $\|F_{A_m}\|_p$, the norm of their curvatures. Then there exists a sequence $u_m\in\mathcal{G}^{2,p}(P)$ of gauge transformations, so that $u_m^*A_m$ converges weakly. In other words, any $L^p$-bounded subset of $\mathcal{A}^{1,p}(P)/\mathcal{G}^{2,p}(P)$ is weakly compact.

== Uhlenbeck's strong compactness theorem ==
Let $X$ be a $n$-dimensional compact Riemannian manifold and $P\twoheadrightarrow X$ be a principal $G$-bundle with a compact Lie group $G$. Let $1<p<\infty$ with $p>n/2$ and $p>4/3$ if $n=2$. Let $(A_m)_{m\in\mathbb{N}}\in\mathcal{A}^{1,p}(P) :=W^{1,p}(X,\operatorname{Ad}(P))\subset L^p(X,\operatorname{Ad}(P))$ be a sequence of weak Yang–Mills connections, hence so that:

$$\int_X\langle F_{A_m},\mathrm{d}_{A_m}\beta\rangle\mathrm{d}\operatorname{vol}_g=0$$

for all $m\in\mathbb{N}$ and $\beta\in\mathcal{A}^{1,p}(P)$, with uniform bound for $\|F_{A_m}\|_p$. Then there exists a subsequence, also denoted $(A_m)_{m\in\mathbb{N}}$, and a sequence $u_m\in\mathcal{G}^{2,p}(P)$ of gauge transformations, so that $u_m^*A_m$ converges uniformly to a smooth connection $A\in\mathcal{A}(P)$. (Uhlenbeck's strong compactness theorem is not stated explicitly in Uhlenbeck's 1982 paper, but follows from the results within.)

== See also ==
- Uhlenbeck's singularity theorem, also first published in the same journal

== Literature ==
- Uhlenbeck, Karen (February 1982). "Connections with Lp bounds on curvature". Communications in Mathematical Physics. 83: 31–42. doi:10.1007/BF01947069.
- Wehrheim, Katrin (2004-01-31). Uhlenbeck Compactness (PDF). EMS Series of Lectures in Mathematics. Vol. 1. doi:10.4171/004. ISBN 978-3-03719-004-3.
- Waldron, Alex (2018-12-28). "Uhlenbeck compactness for Yang-Mills flow in higher dimensions". arXiv:1812.10863 [math.DG].
