= Olke C. Uhlenbeck =

RNA biochemist

O. C. Uhlenbeck
- Citizenship: American
- Education: University of Michigan; Harvard University
- Known for: RNA synthesis from synthetic templates, RNA-protein interactions, RNA Biochemistry
- Spouse: Karen Uhlenbeck (m. 1965–1976)
- Father: George Uhlenbeck
- Scientific career
- Fields: Biochemistry; Biophysics
- Workplaces: University of Illinois; University of Colorado; Northwestern University
- Doctoral advisor: Paul Doty

Olke C. Uhlenbeck is a professor emeritus of biochemistry at the University of Colorado Boulder and at Northwestern University.

His research group has led to many breakthroughs in RNA biochemistry, including the enzymatic synthesis of RNAs from synthetic DNA templates using T7 RNA polymerase. Olke was a founding member of the RNA Society. His father was theoretical physicist George Uhlenbeck.

== Education ==
He completed his undergraduate degree at the University of Michigan at Ann Arbor in 1964, and then completed his doctorate in biophysics at Harvard University in 1969 under the supervision of Paul Doty. As a graduate student in Paul Doty's lab, Uhlenbeck showed that the anticodon of tRNA was accessible to hybridization to oligonucleotides.

== Research ==
He is known for his studies of RNA biochemistry. Some have called him the "Father of RNA".

Uhlenbeck was first published in 1968 at Harvard University for an article titled, "Some Effects on Noncomplementary Bases on the Stability of Helical Complexes of Polyribonucleotides". The study overviews the conformation of specific polyribonucleotide sequences.

A visual representation of a molecule of RNA.

In the 1970s, he began his work on RNA. As a Miller Research Fellow in Ignacio Tinoco, Jr.'s lab he helped define an original model for RNA secondary structure prediction.

In 1987, his research found that transcription occurs at variable initiation sites that can produce small nucleotide strands. These different strands contribute to the variability of RNA. Uhlenbeck and colleagues described a method to make small ribonucleotide sequences that were specific to synthetic DNA used in the study.

He has also researched RNA polymerases that are involved in the creation of DNA synthesis, working on the analysis and understanding of the R17 protein coat. Following that research, he along with a group of colleagues defined the accepted model of RNA secondary structure.

Uhlenbeck studied how amino acids that are esterified interact with tRNA differently.

== Uhlenbeck Lab ==
Uhlenbeck runs the Uhlenbeck lab at Northwestern University after having moved it from the University of Colorado Boulder. Their current research focuses on the recognition and activity of modified tRNA. One of their major focuses is the development of an aminoacyl tRNA synthetase, which allows the researchers to conduct their experiment when there is excess enzyme in the environment.

Notable contributions include:

- Walker, G. C.; Uhlenbeck, OC; Bedows, E; Gumport, RI (1975). "T4-Induced RNA Ligase Joins Single-Stranded Oligoribonucleotides". Proceedings of the National Academy of Sciences. 72 (1): 122–6. Bibcode:1975PNAS...72..122W. doi:10.1073/pnas.72.1.122. PMC 432253. PMID 1090929.
- England, Thomas E.; Uhlenbeck, Olke C. (1978). "3′-Terminal labelling of RNA with T4 RNA ligase". Nature. 275 (5680): 560–1. Bibcode:1978Natur.275..560E. doi:10.1038/275560a0. PMID 692735. S2CID 4153471.
- Milligan, John F.; Groebe, Duncan R.; Witherell, Gary W.; Uhlenbeck, Olke C. (1987). "Oligoribonucleotide synthesis using T7 RNA polymerase and synthetic DNA templates". Nucleic Acids Research. 15 (21): 8783–98. doi:10.1093/nar/15.21.8783. PMC 306405. PMID 3684574.
- Milligan, John F.; Groebe, Duncan R.; Witherell, Gary W.; Uhlenbeck, Olke C. (1987). "Oligoribonucleotide synthesis using T7 RNA polymerase and synthetic DNA templates". Nucleic Acids Research. 15 (21): 8783–98. doi:10.1093/nar/15.21.8783. PMC 306405. PMID 3684574.
- Hertel, Klemens J.; Herschlag, Daniel; Uhlenbeck, Olke C. (1994). "A Kinetic and Thermodynamic Framework for the Hammerhead Ribozyme Reaction". Biochemistry. 33 (11): 3374–85. doi:10.1021/bi00177a031. PMID 8136375.
- Johansson, H. E. (1998). "A thermodynamic analysis of the sequence-specific binding of RNA by bacteriophage MS2 coat protein". Proceedings of the National Academy of Sciences. 95 (16): 9244–9. Bibcode:1998PNAS...95.9244J. doi:10.1073/pnas.95.16.9244. PMC 21323. PMID 9689065.
- Sampson, J. R. (1988). "Biochemical and Physical Characterization of an Unmodified Yeast Phenylalanine Transfer RNA Transcribed in vitro". Proceedings of the National Academy of Sciences. 85 (4): 1033–7. Bibcode:1988PNAS...85.1033S. doi:10.1073/pnas.85.4.1033. JSTOR 30928. PMC 279695. PMID 3277187.
- Sampson, JR; Direnzo, A.; Behlen, L.; Uhlenbeck, O. (1989). "Nucleotides in yeast tRNAPhe required for the specific recognition by its cognate synthetase". Science. 243 (4896): 1363–6. Bibcode:1989Sci...243.1363S. doi:10.1126/science.2646717. PMID 2646717.
- Lariviere, F. J.; Wolfson, AD; Uhlenbeck, OC (2001). "Uniform Binding of Aminoacyl-tRNAs to Elongation Factor Tu by Thermodynamic Compensation". Science. 294 (5540): 165–8. Bibcode:2001Sci...294..165L. doi:10.1126/science.1064242. PMID 11588263. S2CID 26192336.

== Recognition ==
In 1993, Uhlenbeck was inducted into the National Academy of Sciences for his work in RNA biochemistry.

John Milligan and his wife created the "Olke C. Uhlenbeck Endowed Graduate Fund" which funds the tuition of first-year graduate students pursuing their doctorate degrees at the University of Colorado, Boulder. It was named after Uhlenbeck because of the impact he made on the biochemistry department at Colorado.

In 2013, Uhlenbeck was awarded the Fritz Lipmann Lectureship, which is given to someone who has made substantial and influential advancements in biochemistry. He was awarded this due to his research on RNA biochemistry. The award includes a $3,000 prize and funding to present at the Experimental Biology conference in Boston.

== Personal life ==
Uhlenbeck's father was theoretical physicist George Uhlenbeck. He was married to Karen Uhlenbeck between 1965 and 1976. John F. Milligan, a colleague of Uhlenbeck's, said that he appreciated the conversations they had as he developed into a scientist. He also said that Uhlenbeck taught him how to be a leader by showing him what it meant to be engaged in research and how to be intellectually curious. This was said by Milligan after his time working in the Uhlenbeck lab at the CU Boulder.

== See also ==
- List of RNA biologists
