= Six-dimensional holomorphic Chern–Simons theory =

Complex three dimensional gauge theory

In mathematical physics, six-dimensional holomorphic Chern–Simons theory or sometimes holomorphic Chern–Simons theory is a gauge theory on a three-dimensional complex manifold. It is a complex analogue of Chern–Simons theory, named after Shiing-Shen Chern and James Simons who first studied Chern–Simons forms which appear in the action of Chern–Simons theory. The theory is referred to as six-dimensional as the underlying manifold of the theory is three-dimensional as a complex manifold, hence six-dimensional as a real manifold.

The theory has been used to study integrable systems through four-dimensional Chern–Simons theory, which can be viewed as a symmetry reduction of the six-dimensional theory. For this purpose, the underlying three-dimensional complex manifold is taken to be the three-dimensional complex projective space $\mathbb{P}^3$, viewed as twistor space.

== Formulation ==
The background manifold $\mathcal{W}$ on which the theory is defined is a complex manifold which has three complex dimensions and therefore six real dimensions. The theory is a gauge theory with gauge group a complex, simple Lie group $G.$ The field content is a partial connection $\bar \mathcal{A}$.

The action is
$$S_{\mathrm{HCS}}[\bar\mathcal{A}] = \frac{1}{2\pi i} \int_{\mathcal W} \Omega \wedge \mathrm{HCS}(\bar \mathcal{A})$$
where
$$\mathrm{HCS}(\bar \mathcal{A}) = \mathrm{tr}\left(\bar \mathcal{A} \wedge \bar \partial \bar \mathcal{A} + \frac{2}{3} \bar \mathcal{A} \wedge \bar \mathcal{A} \wedge \bar \mathcal{A}\right)$$
where $\Omega$ is a holomorphic (3,0)-form and with $\mathrm{tr}$ denoting a trace functional which as a bilinear form is proportional to the Killing form.

== On twistor space P^{3} ==
Here $\mathcal{W}$ is fixed to be $\mathbb{P}^3$. For application to integrable theory, the three form $\Omega$ must be chosen to be meromorphic.

== See also ==
- Chern–Simons theory
- Four-dimensional Chern-Simons theory
- Infinite-dimensional Chern–Simons theory
