= (−2,3,7) pretzel knot =

Type of mathematical knot

- Arf invariant: 0
- Crosscap no.: 2
- Crossing no.: 12
- Hyperbolic volume: 2.828122
- Unknotting no.: 5
- Conway notation: [−2,3,7]
- Dowker notation: 4, 8, -16, 2, -18, -20, -22, -24, -6, -10, -12, -14
- D–T notation: 12n242
- Last / Next: 12n241 / 12n243

Other
- hyperbolic, fibered, pretzel, reversible

In geometric topology, a branch of mathematics, the (−2, 3, 7) pretzel knot, sometimes called the Fintushel–Stern knot (after Ron Fintushel and Ronald J. Stern), is an important example of a pretzel knot which exhibits various interesting phenomena under three-dimensional and four-dimensional surgery constructions.

== Mathematical properties ==
The (−2, 3, 7) pretzel knot has 7 exceptional slopes, Dehn surgery slopes which give non-hyperbolic 3-manifolds. Among the enumerated knots, the only other hyperbolic knot with 7 or more is the figure-eight knot, which has 10. All other hyperbolic knots are conjectured to have at most 6 exceptional slopes.

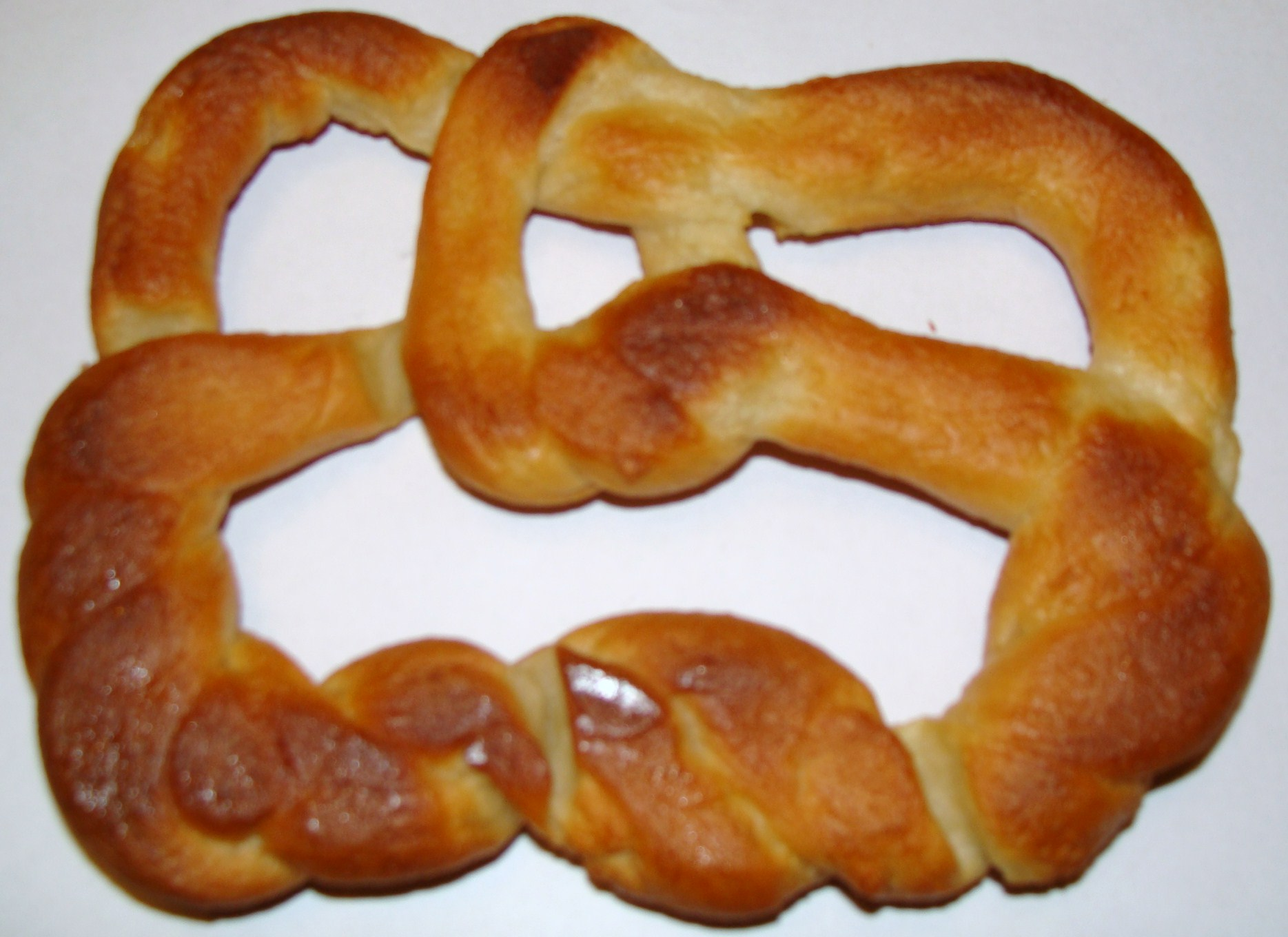
A pretzel (−2,3,7) pretzel knot.
