= The Geometry of Four-Manifolds =

Mathematics textbook

- Author: Simon Donaldson and Peter Kronheimer
- Language: English
- Publisher: Oxford University Press
- Publication date: 1990
- ISBN: 978-0-198-53553-9

The Geometry of Four-Manifolds is a mathematical textbook about Yang–Mills theory, or more generally gauge theory, and its application to the study of the geometry and topology of smooth 4-manifolds as described by Donaldson theory. It is considered a standard work for this topic. It was written by Simon Donaldson, who received the Fields Medal in 1986 for his work in the field, and Peter Kronheimer. It was published on 13 September 1990 with a second revised edition in 1997.

== Content ==
The Geometry of Four-Manifolds first describes the foundations of the theories of 4-manifolds and connections on principal bundles as well as connections on vector bundles. Afterwards it explains Yang–Mills theory, which includes Uhlenbeck's singularity theorem, the ADHM construction and the central Yang–Mills moduli space, on which Donaldson invariants are based on. A special focus lies on the combination with complex geometry, which includes Kähler manifolds and (stable) holomorphic vector bundles.

== Background ==
Simon Donaldson and Peter Kronheimer both obtained their DPhil at the University of Oxford under the supervision of Michael Francis Atiyah, in the years 1983 and 1986 respectively. Simon Donaldson was invited speaker at the International Congress of Mathematicians (ICM) and gave plenar talks about Gauge theory and topology as well as Geometry of Four-Manifolds.

== Reviews ==
Elmer Rees wrote, the textbook is a "polished account of Donaldson's pioneering work; also included are several of the consequent developments in which he has played the leading role". Furthermore, "For someone with a good working knowledge of a range of graduate level courses, this book is self-contained."

== See also ==
- Instantons and Four-Manifolds (1984), mathematical textbook about the same topics

== Literature ==
- Donaldson, Simon K.; Kronheimer, Peter B. (1990-09-13). The Geometry of Four-Manifolds. Oxford University Press. doi:10.1093/oso/9780198535539.001.0001. ISBN 978-0-198-53553-9.
