= Garnier integrable system =

Integrable classical system

In mathematical physics, the Garnier integrable system, also known as the classical Gaudin model, is a classical mechanical system discovered by René Garnier in 1917, and solved using abelian integrals on compact Riemann surfaces (algebraic curves) of arbitrarily high genus. It is obtained by taking the 'Painlevé simplification' or 'autonomous limit' of the Schlesinger equations. It may be interpreted as the classical limit of the quantum Gaudin model due to Michel Gaudin. (Similarly, the Schlesinger equations are the classical limit of the Knizhnik–Zamolodchikov equations, expressed in the Heisenberg representation.. )

The Garnier systems were later shown to be of Hamiltonian type, defined on a phase space consisting of the Cartesian product of $N$ copies of the dual $\mathfrak{gl(r)}^*$ of the Lie algebra $\mathfrak{gl(r)}^*$, for $N$ a positive integer, and completely integrable in the Hamiltonian sense.

They are also a specific case of Hitchin integrable systems, when the algebraic curve that the theory is defined on is the Riemann sphere and the system is tamely ramified.

== As a limit of the Schlesinger equations ==
The Schlesinger equations are a system of differential equations for $n + 2$ matrix-valued functions $A_i:\mathbb{C}^{n+2} \rightarrow \mathrm{Mat}(m, \mathbb{C})$, given by
$$\frac{\partial A_i}{\partial \lambda_j} = \frac{[A_i,A_j]}{\lambda_i-\lambda_j} \qquad \qquad j\neq i$$
$$\sum_j \frac{\partial A_i}{\partial \lambda_j} = 0.$$

The 'autonomous limit' is given by replacing the $\lambda_i$ dependence in the denominator by constants $\alpha_i$ with $\alpha_{n+1} = 0, \alpha_{n+2} = 1$:
$$\frac{\partial A_i}{\partial \lambda_j} = \frac{[A_i,A_j]}{\alpha_i-\alpha_j} \qquad \qquad j\neq i$$
$$\sum_j \frac{\partial A_i}{\partial \lambda_j} = 0.$$
This is the Garnier system in the form originally derived by Garnier.

== As the classical Gaudin model ==
There is a formulation of the Garnier system as a classical mechanical system, the classical Gaudin model, which quantizes to the quantum Gaudin model and whose equations of motion are equivalent to the Garnier system. This section describes this formulation.

As for any classical system, the Gaudin model is specified by a Poisson manifold $M$ referred to as the phase space, and a smooth function on the manifold called the Hamiltonian.

=== Phase space ===
Let $\mathfrak{g}$ be a quadratic Lie algebra, that is, a Lie algebra with a non-degenerate invariant bilinear form $\kappa$. If $\mathfrak{g}$ is complex and simple, this can be taken to be the Killing form.

The dual, denoted $\mathfrak{g}^*$, can be made into a linear Poisson structure by the Kirillov–Kostant bracket.

The phase space $M$ of the classical Gaudin model is then the Cartesian product of $N$ copies of $\mathfrak{g}^*$ for $N$ a positive integer.

=== Sites ===
Associated to each of these copies is a point in $\mathbb{C}$, denoted $\lambda_1, \cdots, \lambda_N$, and referred to as sites.

=== Lax matrix ===
Fixing a basis of the Lie algebra $\{I^a\}$ with structure constants $f^{ab}_c$, there are functions $X^a_{(r)}$ with $r = 1, \cdots, N$ on the phase space satisfying the Poisson bracket
$$\{X^a_{(r)}, X^b_{(s)}\} = \delta_{rs}f^{ab}_c X^c_{(r)}.$$

These in turn are used to define $\mathfrak{g}$-valued functions
$$X^{(r)} = \kappa_{ab}I^a \otimes X^b_{(r)}$$
with implicit summation.

Next, these are used to define the Lax matrix which is also a $\mathfrak{g}$ valued function on the phase space which in addition depends meromorphically on a spectral parameter $\lambda$,
$$\mathcal{L}(\lambda) = \sum_{r = 1}^N \frac{X^{(r)}}{\lambda - \lambda_r} + \Omega,$$
and $\Omega$ is a constant element in $\mathfrak{g}$, in the sense that it Poisson commutes (has vanishing Poisson bracket) with all functions.

=== (Quadratic) Hamiltonian ===
The (quadratic) Hamiltonian is
$$\mathcal{H}(\lambda) = \frac{1}{2}\kappa(\mathcal{L}(\lambda), \mathcal{L}(\lambda))$$
which is indeed a function on the phase space, which is additionally dependent on a spectral parameter $\lambda$. This can be written as
$$\mathcal{H}(\lambda) = \Delta_\infty + \sum_{r = 1}^N\left( \frac{\Delta_r}{(\lambda - \lambda_r)^2} +
\frac{\mathcal{H}_r}{\lambda - \lambda_r} \right),$$
with
$$\Delta_r = \frac{1}{2} \kappa(X^{(r)}, X^{(r)}), \Delta_\infty = \frac{1}{2} \kappa(\Omega, \Omega)$$
and
$$\mathcal{H}_r = \sum_{s \neq r} \frac{ \kappa( X^{(r)}, X^{(s)} )}{
\lambda_r - \lambda_s} + \kappa(X^{(r)} , \Omega).$$

From the Poisson bracket relation
$$\{ \mathcal{H}(\lambda), \mathcal{H}(\mu) \} = 0,  \forall \lambda, \mu \in \mathbb{C},$$
by varying $\lambda$ and $\mu$ it must be true that the $\mathcal{H}_r$'s, the $\Delta_r$'s and $\Delta_\infty$ are all in involution. It can be shown that the $\Delta_r$'s and $\Delta_\infty$ Poisson commute with all functions on the phase space, but the $\mathcal{H}_r$'s do not in general. These are the conserved charges in involution for the purposes of Arnol'd Liouville integrability.

=== Lax equation ===
One can show
$$\{\mathcal{H}_r, \mathcal{L}(\lambda)\} = \left[\frac{X^{(r)}}{\lambda - \lambda_r}, \mathcal{L}(\lambda)\right],$$
so the Lax matrix satisfies the Lax equation when time evolution is given by any of the Hamiltonians $\mathcal{H}_r$, as well as any linear combination of them.

=== Higher Hamiltonians ===
The quadratic Casimir gives corresponds to a quadratic Weyl invariant polynomial for the Lie algebra $\mathfrak{g}$, but in fact many more commuting conserved charges can be generated using $\mathfrak{g}$-invariant polynomials. These invariant polynomials can be found using the Harish-Chandra isomorphism in the case $\mathfrak{g}$ is complex, simple and finite.

== Integrable field theories as classical Gaudin models ==
Certain integrable classical field theories can be formulated as classical affine Gaudin models, where $\mathfrak{g}$ is an affine Lie algebra. Such classical field theories include the principal chiral model, coset sigma models and affine Toda field theory. As such, affine Gaudin models can be seen as a 'master theory' for integrable systems, but is most naturally formulated in the Hamiltonian formalism, unlike other master theories like four-dimensional Chern–Simons theory or anti-self-dual Yang–Mills.

== Quantum Gaudin models ==
A great deal is known about the integrable structure of quantum Gaudin models. In particular, Feigin, Frenkel and Reshetikhin studied them using the theory of vertex operator algebras, showing the relation of Gaudin models to topics in mathematics including the Knizhnik–Zamolodchikov equations and the geometric Langlands correspondence.
