= Infinite-dimensional Chern–Simons theory =

Chern–Simons theory on infinite-dimensional manifolds

In mathematics, infinite-dimensional Chern–Simons theory (not to be confused with ∞-Chern–Simons theory) is a generalization of Chern–Simons theory to manifolds with infinite dimensions. These are not modeled with finite-dimensional Euclidean spaces, but infinite-dimensional topological vector spaces, for example Hilbert, Banach and Fréchet spaces, which lead to Hilbert, Banach and Fréchet manifolds respectively. Principal bundles, which in finite-dimensional Chern–Simons theory are considered with (compact) Lie groups as gauge groups, are then fittingly considered with Hilbert Lie, Banach Lie and Fréchet Lie groups as gauge groups respectively, which also makes their total spaces into a Hilbert, Banach and Fréchet manifold respectively. These are called Hilbert, Banach and Fréchet principal bundles respectively. The theory is named after Shiing-Shen Chern and James Simons, who first described Chern–Simons forms in 1974, although the generalization was not developed by them.

== See also ==
- Four-dimensional Chern–Simons theory
- Six-dimensional holomorphic Chern–Simons theory

== Literature ==
- Paycha, Sylvie; Rosenberg, Steven (2003-02-21). "Chern-Weil Constructions on ΨDO Bundles". arXiv:math/0301185.
- Rosenberg, Steven; Torres-Ardila, Fabian (2004-11-08). "Infinite Dimensional Chern-Simons Theory". arXiv:math/0411161.
- Andrés Larrain-Hubach, Steven Rosenberg, Simon Scott, Fabián Torres-Ardila (2010-05-26). "Characteristic Classes and Zeroth Order Pseudodifferential Operators". arXiv:1003.0067 [math.DG].
- Maeda, Yoshiaki; Rosenberg, Steven; Torres-Ardila, Fabián. "Riemannian geometry on loop spaces, part II: characteristic classes on LM" (PDF).
- Paycha, Sylvie; Scott, Simon (2006). "Chern-Weil forms associated with superconnections". Analysis, Geometry and Topology of Elliptic Operators. pp. 79–104. doi:10.1142/9789812773609_0005. ISBN 978-981-256-805-2.
- Vozzo, Raymond (2010). "Loop Groups and Characteristic Classes".
