= Donaldson's theorem =

On when a definite intersection form of a smooth 4-manifold is diagonalizable

In mathematics, and especially differential topology and gauge theory, Donaldson's theorem states that a definite intersection form of a closed, oriented, smooth manifold of dimension 4 is diagonalizable. If the intersection form is positive (negative) definite, it can be diagonalized to the identity matrix (negative identity matrix) over the integers. The original version of the theorem required the manifold to be simply connected, but it was later improved to apply to 4-manifolds with any fundamental group.

== History ==
The theorem was proved by Simon Donaldson. This was a contribution cited for his Fields Medal in 1986.

== Idea of proof ==
Donaldson's proof utilizes the Yang–Mills moduli space $\mathcal{M}_P$ of solutions to the anti-self-duality equations on a principal $\operatorname{SU}(2)$-bundle $P$ over the four-manifold $X$. By the Atiyah–Singer index theorem, the dimension of the moduli space is given by

$$\dim \mathcal{M} = 8k - 3(1-b_1(X) + b_+(X)),$$

where $k=c_2(P)$ is a Chern class, $b_1(X)$ is the first Betti number of $X$, and $b_+(X)$ is the dimension of the positive-definite subspace of $H_2(X,\mathbb{R})$ with respect to the intersection form. When $X$ is simply-connected with definite intersection form, possibly after changing orientation, one always has $b_1(X) = 0$ and $b_+(X)=0$. Thus taking any principal $\operatorname{SU}(2)$-bundle with $k=1$, one obtains a moduli space $\mathcal{M}$ of dimension five.

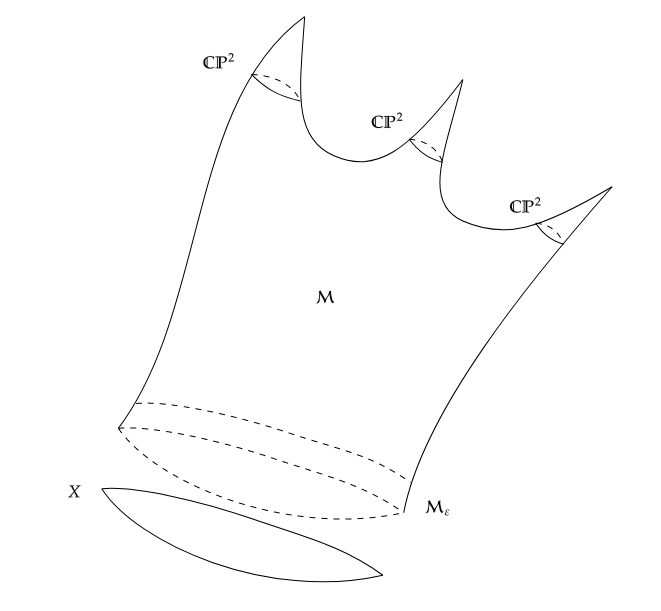
Visualisation of the cobordism given by the Yang–Mills moduli space in Donaldson's theorem

This moduli space is non-compact and generically smooth, with singularities occurring only at the points corresponding to reducible connections, of which there are exactly $b_2(X)$ many. Results of Clifford Taubes and Karen Uhlenbeck show that whilst $\mathcal{M}$ is non-compact, its structure at infinity can be readily described. Namely, there is an open subset of $\mathcal{M}$, say $\mathcal{M}_{\varepsilon}$, such that for sufficiently small choices of parameter $\varepsilon$, there is a diffeomorphism

$$\mathcal{M}_{\varepsilon} \xrightarrow{\quad \cong\quad} X\times (0,\varepsilon)$$.

The work of Taubes and Uhlenbeck essentially concerns constructing sequences of ASD connections on the four-manifold $X$ with curvature becoming infinitely concentrated at any given single point $x\in X$. For each such point, in the limit one obtains a unique singular ASD connection, which becomes a well-defined smooth ASD connection at that point using Uhlenbeck's singularity theorem.

Donaldson observed that the singular points in the interior of $\mathcal{M}$ corresponding to reducible connections could also be described: they looked like cones over the complex projective plane $\mathbb{CP}^2$. Furthermore, we can count the number of such singular points. Let $E$ be the $\mathbb{C}^2$-bundle over $X$ associated to $P$ by the standard representation of $SU(2)$. Then, reducible connections modulo gauge are in a 1-1 correspondence with splittings $E = L\oplus L^{-1}$ where $L$ is a complex line bundle over $X$. Whenever $E = L\oplus L^{-1}$ we may compute:

$1 = k = c_2(E) = c_2(L\oplus L^{-1}) = - Q(c_1(L), c_1(L))$,

where $Q$ is the intersection form on the second cohomology of $X$. Since line bundles over $X$ are classified by their first Chern class $c_1(L)\in H^2(X; \mathbb{Z})$, we get that reducible connections modulo gauge are in a 1-1 correspondence with pairs $\pm\alpha\in H^2(X; \mathbb{Z})$ such that $Q(\alpha, \alpha) = -1$. Let the number of pairs be $n(Q)$. An elementary argument that applies to any negative definite quadratic form over the integers tells us that $n(Q)\leq\text{rank}(Q)$, with equality if and only if $Q$ is diagonalizable.

It is thus possible to compactify the moduli space as follows: First, cut off each cone at a reducible singularity and glue in a copy of $\mathbb{CP}^2$. Secondly, glue in a copy of $X$ itself at infinity. The resulting space is a cobordism between $X$ and a disjoint union of $n(Q)$ copies of $\mathbb{CP}^2$ (of unknown orientations). The signature $\sigma$ of a four-manifold is a cobordism invariant. Thus, because $X$ is definite:

$\text{rank}(Q) = b_2(X) = \sigma(X) = \sigma(\bigsqcup n(Q) \mathbb{CP}^2) \leq n(Q)$,

from which one concludes the intersection form of $X$ is diagonalizable.

== Extensions ==
Michael Freedman had previously shown that any unimodular symmetric bilinear form is realized as the intersection form of some closed, oriented four-manifold. Combining this result with the Serre classification theorem and Donaldson's theorem, several interesting results can be seen:

1) Any definite non-diagonalizable intersection form gives rise to a four-dimensional topological manifold with no differentiable structure (so cannot be smoothed).

2) Two smooth simply-connected 4-manifolds are homeomorphic, if and only if, their intersection forms have the same rank, signature, and parity.

== See also ==
- Unimodular lattice
- Donaldson theory
- Yang–Mills equations
- Rokhlin's theorem
