= Four-dimensional Chern–Simons theory =

Gauge theory providing unifying formalism for integrable systems

In mathematical physics, four-dimensional Chern–Simons theory, also known as semi-holomorphic or semi-topological Chern–Simons theory, is a quantum field theory initially defined by Nikita Nekrasov, rediscovered and studied by Kevin Costello, and later by Edward Witten and Masahito Yamazaki. It is named after mathematicians Shiing-Shen Chern and James Simons who discovered the Chern–Simons 3-form appearing in the theory.

The gauge theory has been demonstrated to be related to many integrable systems, including exactly solvable lattice models such as the six-vertex model of Lieb and the Heisenberg spin chain and integrable field theories such as principal chiral models, symmetric space coset sigma models and Toda field theory, although the integrable field theories require the introduction of two-dimensional surface defects. The theory is also related to the Yang–Baxter equation and quantum groups such as the Yangian.

The theory is similar to three-dimensional Chern–Simons theory which is a topological quantum field theory, and the relation of 4d Chern–Simons theory to the Yang–Baxter equation bears similarities to the relation of 3d Chern–Simons theory to knot invariants such as the Jones polynomial discovered by Witten.

== Formulation ==
The theory is defined on a 4-dimensional manifold which is a product of two 2-dimensional manifolds: $M = \Sigma \times C$, where $\Sigma$ is a smooth orientable 2-dimensional manifold, and $C$ is a complex curve (hence has real dimension 2) endowed with a meromorphic one-form $\omega$.

The field content is a gauge field $A$. The action is given by wedging the Chern–Simons 3-form $CS(A)$ with $\omega$:
$$S_{4d} = \frac{1}{2\pi} \int_M \omega \wedge CS(A).$$

=== Restrictions on underlying manifolds ===
A heuristic puts strong restrictions on the $C$ to be considered. This theory is studied perturbatively, in the limit that the Planck constant $\hbar << 1$. In the path integral formulation, the action will contain a ratio $\omega/\hbar$. Therefore, zeroes of $\omega$ naïvely correspond to points at which $\hbar \rightarrow \infty$, at which point perturbation theory breaks down. So $\omega$ may have poles, but not zeroes. A corollary of the Riemann–Roch theorem relates the degree of the canonical divisor defined by $\omega$ (equal to the difference between the number of zeros and poles of $\omega$, with multiplicity) to the genus $g$ of the curve $C$, giving
$$\text{number of zeros of } \omega - \text{number of poles of } \omega = 2g - 2$$
Then imposing that $\omega$ has no zeroes, $g$ must be $0$ or $1$. In the latter case, $\omega$ has no poles and $C = \mathbb{C}/\Lambda$ a complex torus (with $\Lambda$ a 2d lattice). If $g = 0$, then $C$ is $\mathbb{CP}^1$ the complex projective line. The form $\omega$ has two poles; either a single pole with multiplicity 2, in which case it can be realized as $\omega = dz$ on $\mathbb{C}$, or two poles of multiplicity one, which can be realized as $\omega = \frac{dz}{z}$ on $\mathbb{C}^\times \cong \mathbb{C}/\mathbb{Z}$. Therefore $C$ is either a complex plane, cylinder or torus.

There is also a topological restriction on $\Sigma$, due to a possible framing anomaly. This imposes that $\Sigma$ must be a parallelizable 2d manifold, which is also a strong restriction: for example, if $\Sigma$ is compact, then it is a torus.

=== Surface defects and field theories ===
The above is sufficient to obtain spin chains from the theory, but to obtain 2-dimensional integrable field theories, one must introduce so-called surface defects. A surface defect, often labelled $D$, is a 2-dimensional 'object' which is considered to be localized at a point $z$ on the complex curve but covers $\Sigma,$ which is fixed to be $\mathbb{R}^2$ for engineering integrable field theories. This defect $D$ is then the space on which a 2-dimensional field theory lives, and this theory couples to the bulk gauge field $A$.

Supposing the bulk gauge field $A$ has gauge group $G$, the field theory on the defect can interact with the bulk gauge field if it has global symmetry group $G$, so that it has a current $J$ which can couple via a term which is schematically $\int JA$.

In general, one can have multiple defects $D_\alpha$ with $\alpha = 1, \cdots, n$, and the action for the coupled theory is then
$$S_{4d-2d} = \frac{1}{2\hbar\pi} \int_{\mathbb R^2 \times C} \omega \wedge CS(A) + \sum_{\alpha = 1}^{n} \frac{1}{\hbar} \int_{\mathbb{R}^2 \times z_\alpha} \mathcal{L}_\alpha (\phi_\alpha;
A_w|_{z_\alpha}, A_{\overline w}|_{z_\alpha}),$$
with $\phi_\alpha$ the collection of fields for the field theory on $D_\alpha$, and coordinates $w, \overline w$ for $\mathbb{R}^2$.

There are two distinct classes of defects:

1. Order defects, which introduce new degrees of freedom on the defect which couple to the bulk gauge field.
2. Disorder defects, where the bulk gauge field has some singularities.

Order defects are easier to define, but disorder defects are required to engineer many of the known 2-dimensional integrable field theories.

== Systems described by 4d Chern–Simons theory ==
=== Spin chains ===
- Six-vertex model
- Eight-vertex model
- XXZ Heisenberg spin-chain

=== Integrable field theories ===
- Gross–Neveu model
- Thirring model
- Wess–Zumino–Witten model
- Principal chiral model and deformations
- Symmetric space coset sigma models

== Master theories of integrable systems ==
4d Chern–Simons theory is a 'master theory' for integrable systems, providing a framework that incorporates many integrable systems. Another theory which shares this feature, but with a Hamiltonian rather than Lagrangian description, is classical affine Gaudin models with a 'dihedral twist', and the two theories have been shown to be closely related.

Another 'master theory' for integrable systems is the anti-self-dual Yang–Mills (ASDYM) system. Ward's conjecture is the conjecture that in fact all integrable ODEs or PDEs come from ASDYM. A connection between 4d Chern–Simons theory and ASDYM has been found so that they in fact come from a six-dimensional holomorphic Chern–Simons theory defined on twistor space. The derivation of integrable systems from this 6d Chern–Simons theory through the alternate routes of 4d Chern–Simons theory and ASDYM in fact fit into a commuting square.

== See also ==
- Chern–Simons theory
- Infinite-dimensional Chern–Simons theory
- Integrable system
- Classical Gaudin model
- Anti-self-dual Yang–Mills equations
