= Yang–Mills equations =

Partial differential equations whose solutions are instantons

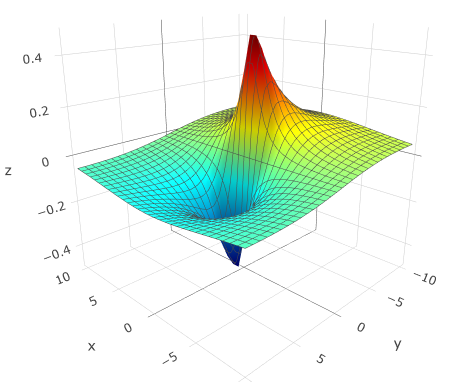
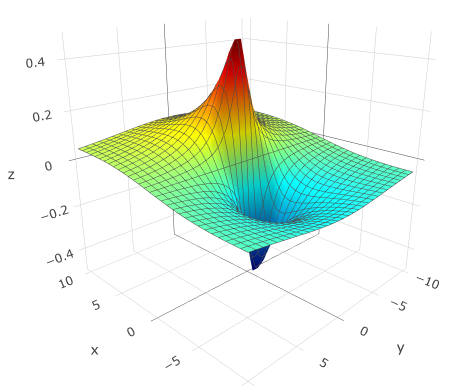
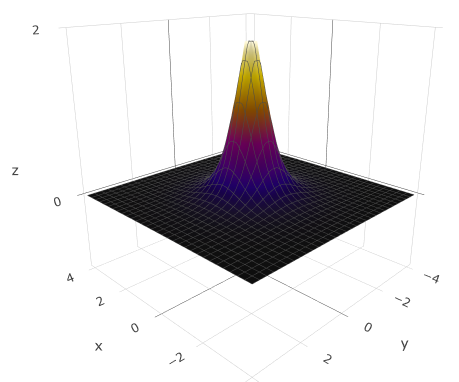
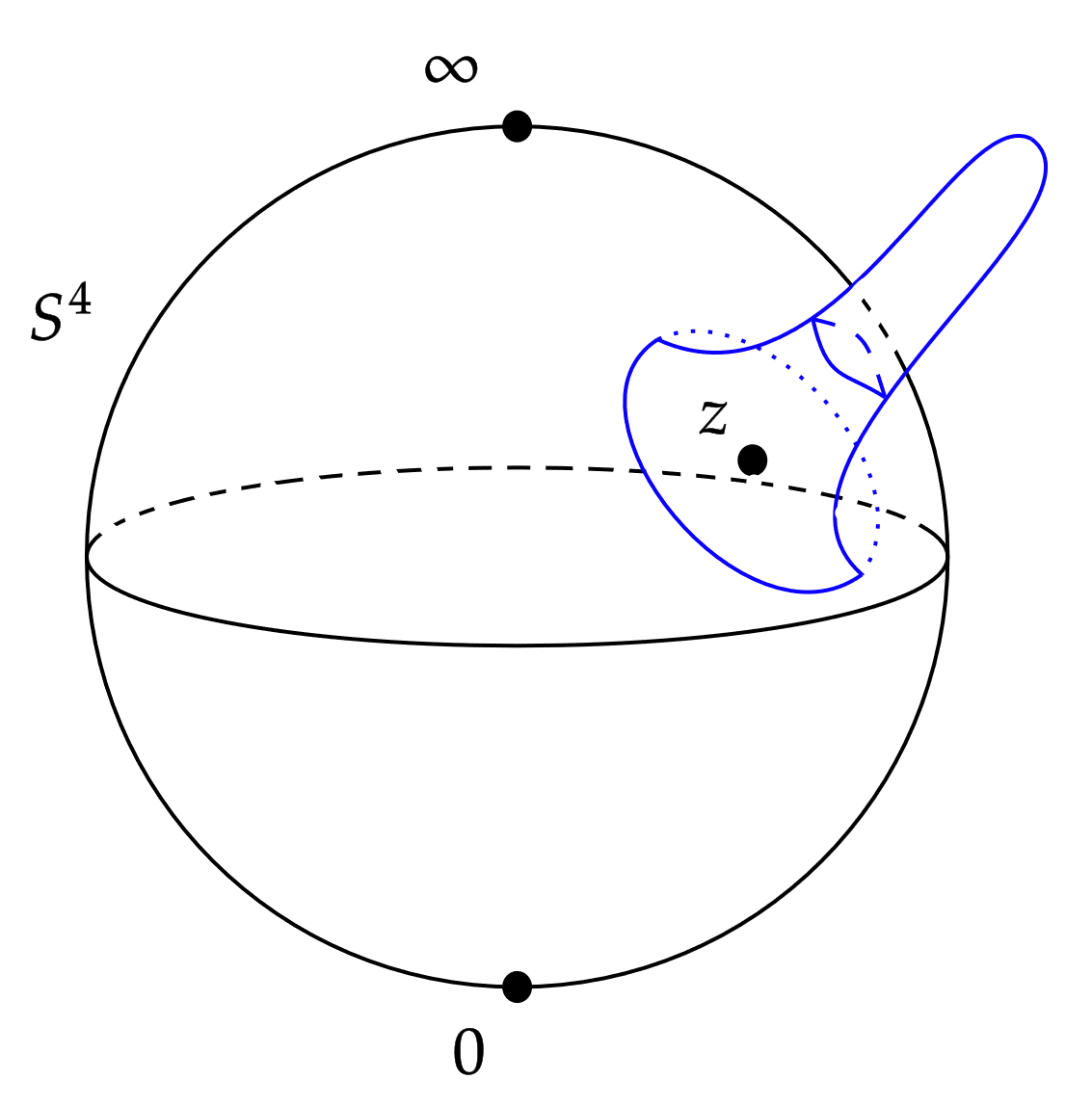
The dx^{1}⊗σ_{3} coefficient of a BPST instanton on the (x^{1},x^{2})-slice of R^{4} where σ_{3} is the third Pauli matrix (top left). The dx^{2}⊗σ_{3} coefficient (top right). These coefficients determine the restriction of the BPST instanton A with g=2, ρ=1,z=0 to this slice. The corresponding field strength centered around z=0 (bottom left). A visual representation of the field strength of a BPST instanton with center z on the compactification S^{4} of R^{4} (bottom right). The BPST instanton is a solution to the anti-self duality equations, and therefore of the Yang–Mills equations, on R^{4}. This solution can be extended by Uhlenbeck's singularity theorem removable singularity theorem to a topologically non-trivial ASD connection on S^{4}.

In physics and mathematics, and especially differential geometry and gauge theory, the Yang–Mills equations are a system of partial differential equations for a connection on a vector bundle or principal bundle. They arise in physics as the Euler–Lagrange equations of the Yang–Mills action functional. They have also found significant use in mathematics.

Solutions of the equations are called Yang–Mills connections. In four-dimensional Euclidean settings, the self-dual or anti-self-dual finite-action solutions are called instantons. The Yang–Mills moduli space was used by Simon Donaldson to prove Donaldson's theorem.

== Motivation ==
=== Physics ===
In their foundational paper on the topic of gauge theories, Robert Mills and Chen-Ning Yang developed (essentially independent of the mathematical literature) the theory of principal bundles and connections in order to explain the concept of gauge symmetry and gauge invariance as it applies to physical theories. The gauge theories Yang and Mills discovered, now called Yang–Mills theories, generalised the classical work of James Maxwell on Maxwell's equations, which had been phrased in the language of a $\operatorname{U}(1)$ gauge theory by Wolfgang Pauli and others. The novelty of the work of Yang and Mills was to define gauge theories for an arbitrary choice of Lie group $G$, called the structure group (or in physics the gauge group, see Gauge group (mathematics) for more details). This group could be non-Abelian as opposed to the case $G=\operatorname{U}(1)$ corresponding to electromagnetism, and the right framework to discuss such objects is the theory of principal bundles.

The essential points of the work of Yang and Mills are as follows. One assumes that the fundamental description of a physical model is through the use of fields, and derives that under a local gauge transformation (change of local trivialisation of principal bundle), these physical fields must transform in precisely the way that a connection $A$ (in physics, a gauge field) on a principal bundle transforms. The gauge field strength is the curvature $F_A$ of the connection, and the energy of the gauge field is given (up to a constant) by the Yang–Mills action functional

$$\operatorname{YM}(A) = \int_X \|F_A\|^2 \, d\mathrm{vol}_g.$$

The principle of least action dictates that the correct equations of motion for this physical theory should be given by the Euler–Lagrange equations of this functional, which are the Yang–Mills equations derived below:

$$d_A \star F_A = 0.$$

=== Mathematics ===
In addition to the physical origins of the theory, the Yang–Mills equations are of important geometric interest. There is in general no natural choice of connection on a vector bundle or principal bundle. In the special case where this bundle is the tangent bundle to a Riemannian manifold, there is such a natural choice, the Levi-Civita connection, but in general there is an infinite-dimensional space of possible choices. A Yang–Mills connection gives some kind of natural choice of a connection for a general fibre bundle, as we now describe.

A connection is defined by its local forms $A_{\alpha}\in \Omega^1(U_{\alpha}, \operatorname{ad} (P))$ for a trivialising open cover $\{U_{\alpha} \}$ for the bundle $P\to X$. The first attempt at choosing a canonical connection might be to demand that these forms vanish. However, this is not possible unless the trivialisation is flat, in the sense that the transition functions $g_{\alpha\beta}: U_{\alpha} \cap U_{\beta} \to G$ are constant functions. Not every bundle is flat, so this is not possible in general. Instead one might ask that the local connection forms $A_{\alpha}$ are themselves constant. On a principal bundle the correct way to phrase this condition is that the curvature $F_A = dA + \frac{1}{2} [A,A]$ vanishes. However, by Chern–Weil theory if the curvature $F_A$ vanishes (that is to say, $A$ is a flat connection), then the underlying principal bundle must have trivial Chern classes, which is a topological obstruction to the existence of flat connections: not every principal bundle can have a flat connection.

The best one can hope for is then to ask that instead of vanishing curvature, the bundle has curvature as small as possible. The Yang–Mills action functional described above is precisely (the square of) the $L^2$-norm of the curvature, and its Euler–Lagrange equations describe the critical points of this functional, either the absolute minima or local minima. That is to say, Yang–Mills connections are precisely those that minimize their curvature. In this sense they are the natural choice of connection on a principal or vector bundle over a manifold from a mathematical point of view.

== Definition ==
Let $X$ be a compact, oriented, Riemannian manifold. The Yang–Mills equations can be phrased for a connection on a vector bundle or principal $G$-bundle over $X$, for some compact Lie group $G$. Here the latter convention is presented. Let $P$ denote a principal $G$-bundle over $X$. Then a connection on $P$ may be specified by a Lie algebra-valued differential form $A$ on the total space of the principal bundle. This connection has a curvature form $F_A$, which is a two-form on $X$ with values in the adjoint bundle $\operatorname{ad}(P)$ of $P$. Associated to the connection $A$ is an exterior covariant derivative $d_A$, defined on the adjoint bundle. Additionally, since $G$ is compact, its associated compact Lie algebra admits an invariant inner product under the adjoint representation.

Since $X$ is Riemannian, there is an inner product on the cotangent bundle, and combined with the invariant inner product on $\operatorname{ad}(P)$ there is an inner product on the bundle $\operatorname{ad}(P)\otimes \Lambda^2 T^* X$ of $\operatorname{ad}(P)$-valued two-forms on $X$. Since $X$ is oriented, there is an $L^2$-inner product on the sections of this bundle. Namely,

$$\langle s,t \rangle_{L^2} = \int_X \langle s, t \rangle\, d vol_g$$

where inside the integral the fiber-wise inner product is being used, and $dvol_g$ is the Riemannian volume form of $X$. Using this $L^2$-inner product, the formal adjoint operator of $d_A$ is defined by

$$\langle d_A s,t \rangle_{L^2} = \langle s, d_A^* t \rangle_{L^2}$$.

Explicitly this is given by $d_A^* = \pm \star d_A \star$ where $\star$ is the Hodge star operator acting on two-forms.

Assuming the above set up, the Yang–Mills equations are a system of (in general non-linear) partial differential equations given by

$d_A^* F_A = 0.$	1

Since the Hodge star is an isomorphism, by the explicit formula for $d_A^*$ the Yang–Mills equations can equivalently be written

$d_A \star F_A = 0.$	2

A connection satisfying (1) or (2) is called a Yang–Mills connection.

Every connection automatically satisfies the Bianchi identity $d_A F_A = 0$, so Yang–Mills connections can be seen as a non-linear analogue of harmonic differential forms, which satisfy

$$d\omega = d^* \omega = 0$$.

In this sense the search for Yang–Mills connections can be compared to Hodge theory, which seeks a harmonic representative in the de Rham cohomology class of a differential form. The analogy being that a Yang–Mills connection is like a harmonic representative in the set of all possible connections on a principal bundle.

== Derivation ==
The Yang–Mills equations are the Euler–Lagrange equations of the Yang–Mills functional, defined by

$\operatorname{YM}(A) = \int_X \|F_A\|^2 \, d\mathrm{vol}_g.$	3

To derive the equations from the functional, recall that the space $\mathcal{A}$ of all connections on $P$ is an affine space modelled on the vector space $\Omega^1(P; \mathfrak{g})$. Given a small deformation $A+ta$ of a connection $A$ in this affine space, the curvatures are related by

$$F_{A+ta} = F_A + td_A a + t^2 a\wedge a.$$

To determine the critical points of (3), compute

$$\begin{align}
\frac{d}{dt} \left(\operatorname{YM}(A+ta)\right)_{t=0} &=  \frac{d}{dt} \left(\int_X \langle F_A + t \, d_A a + t^2 a\wedge a, F_A + t \, d_A a + t^2 a\wedge a\rangle \, d\mathrm{vol}_g\right)_{t=0} \\
&= \frac{d}{dt} \left(\int_X \|F_A\|^2 + 2t\langle F_A, d_A a\rangle + 2t^2\langle F_A, a\wedge a\rangle + t^4 \|a\wedge a\|^2 \, d\mathrm{vol}_g\right)_{t=0}\\
&= 2\int_X \langle d_A^* F_A, a\rangle \, d\mathrm{vol}_g.
\end{align}$$

The connection $A$ is a critical point of the Yang–Mills functional if and only if this vanishes for every $a$, and this occurs precisely when (1) is satisfied.

== Moduli space of Yang–Mills connections ==
The Yang–Mills equations are gauge invariant. Mathematically, a gauge transformation is an automorphism $g$ of the principal bundle $P$, and since the inner product on $\operatorname{ad}(P)$ is invariant, the Yang–Mills functional satisfies

$$\operatorname{YM}(g\cdot A) = \int_X \|gF_Ag^{-1}\|^2 \, d\mathrm{vol}_g = \int_X \|F_A\|^2 \, d\mathrm{vol}_g = \operatorname{YM}(A)$$

and so if $A$ satisfies (1), so does $g\cdot A$.

There is a moduli space of Yang–Mills connections modulo gauge transformations. Denote by $\mathcal{G}$ the gauge group of automorphisms of $P$. The set $\mathcal{B} = \mathcal{A}/\mathcal{G}$ classifies all connections modulo gauge transformations, and the moduli space $\mathcal{M}$ of Yang–Mills connections is a subset. In general neither $\mathcal{B}$ or $\mathcal{M}$ is Hausdorff or a smooth manifold. However, by restricting to irreducible connections, that is, connections $A$ whose holonomy group is given by all of $G$, one does obtain Hausdorff spaces. The space of irreducible connections is denoted $\mathcal{A}^*$, and so the moduli spaces are denoted $\mathcal{B}^*$ and $\mathcal{M}^*$.

Moduli spaces of Yang–Mills connections have been intensively studied in specific circumstances. Michael Atiyah and Raoul Bott studied the Yang–Mills equations for bundles over compact Riemann surfaces. There the moduli space obtains an alternative description as a moduli space of holomorphic vector bundles. This is the Narasimhan–Seshadri theorem, which was proved in this form relating Yang–Mills connections to holomorphic vector bundles by Donaldson. In this setting the moduli space has the structure of a compact Kähler manifold. Moduli of Yang–Mills connections have been most studied when the dimension of the base manifold $X$ is four. Here the Yang–Mills equations admit a simplification from a second-order PDE to a first-order PDE, the anti-self-duality equations.

== Anti-self-duality equations ==
When the dimension of the base manifold $X$ is four, a coincidence occurs: the Hodge star operator maps two-forms to two-forms,

$$\star : \Omega^2(X) \to \Omega^2(X)$$.

The Hodge star operator squares to the identity in this case, and so has eigenvalues $1$ and $-1$. In particular, there is a decomposition

$$\Omega^2(X) = \Omega_+(X) \oplus \Omega_-(X)$$

into the positive and negative eigenspaces of $\star$, the self-dual and anti-self-dual two-forms. If a connection $A$ on a principal $G$-bundle over a four-manifold $X$ satisfies either $F_A = {\star F_A}$ or $F_A = - {\star F_A}$, then by (2), the connection is a Yang–Mills connection. These connections are called either self-dual connections or anti-self-dual connections, and the equations the self-duality (SD) equations and the anti-self-duality (ASD) equations. The spaces of self-dual and anti-self-dual connections are denoted by $\mathcal{A}^+$ and $\mathcal{A}^-$, and similarly for $\mathcal{B}^{\pm}$ and $\mathcal{M}^{\pm}$.

The moduli space of ASD connections, or instantons, was most intensively studied by Donaldson in the case where $G=\operatorname{SU}(2)$ and $X$ is simply-connected. In this setting, the principal $\operatorname{SU}(2)$-bundle is classified by its second Chern class, $c_2(P)\in H^4(X, \mathbb{Z}) \cong \mathbb{Z}$. (Note: For a proof of this fact, see the post https://mathoverflow.net/a/265399.) For various choices of principal bundle, one obtains moduli spaces with interesting properties. These spaces are Hausdorff, even when allowing reducible connections, and are generically smooth. It was shown by Donaldson that the smooth part is orientable. By the Atiyah–Singer index theorem, one may compute that the dimension of $\mathcal{M}_k^-$, the moduli space of ASD connections when $c_2(P) = k$, to be

$$\dim \mathcal{M}_k^- = 8k - 3(1-b_1(X) + b_+(X))$$

where $b_1(X)$ is the first Betti number of $X$, and $b_+(X)$ is the dimension of the positive-definite subspace of $H_2(X,\mathbb{R})$ with respect to the intersection form on $X$. For example, when $X=S^4$ and $k=1$, the intersection form is trivial and the moduli space has dimension $\dim \mathcal{M}_1^-(S^4) = 8-3 = 5$. This agrees with existence of the BPST instanton, which is the unique ASD instanton on $S^4$ up to a 5 parameter family defining its centre in $\mathbb{R}^4$ and its scale. Such instantons on $\mathbb{R}^4$ may be extended across the point at infinity using Uhlenbeck's singularity theorem. More generally, for positive $k,$ the moduli space has dimension $8k-3.$

== Applications ==
=== Donaldson's theorem ===
The moduli space of Yang–Mills equations was used by Donaldson to prove Donaldson's theorem about the intersection form of simply-connected four-manifolds. Using analytical results of Clifford Taubes and Karen Uhlenbeck, Donaldson was able to show that in specific circumstances (when the intersection form is definite) the moduli space of ASD instantons on a smooth, compact, oriented, simply-connected four-manifold $X$ gives a cobordism between a copy of the manifold itself, and a disjoint union of copies of the complex projective plane $\mathbb{CP}^2$. We can count the number of copies of $\mathbb{CP}^2$ in two ways: once using that signature is a cobordism invariant, and another using a Hodge-theoretic interpretation of reducible connections. Interpreting these counts carefully, one can conclude that such a smooth manifold has diagonalisable intersection form.

The moduli space of ASD instantons may be used to define further invariants of four-manifolds. Donaldson defined polynomials on the second homology group of a suitably restricted class of four-manifolds, arising from pairings of cohomology classes on the moduli space. This work has subsequently been surpassed by Seiberg–Witten invariants.

=== Dimensional reduction and other moduli spaces ===
Through the process of dimensional reduction, the Yang–Mills equations may be used to derive other important equations in differential geometry and gauge theory. Dimensional reduction is the process of taking the Yang–Mills equations over a four-manifold, typically $\mathbb{R}^4$, and imposing that the solutions be invariant under a symmetry group. For example:

- By requiring the anti-self-duality equations to be invariant under translations in a single direction of $\mathbb{R}^4$, one obtains the Bogomolny equations which describe magnetic monopoles on $\mathbb{R}^3$.
- By requiring the self-duality equations to be invariant under translation in two directions, one obtains Hitchin's equations first investigated by Hitchin. These equations naturally lead to the study of Higgs bundles and the Hitchin system.
- By requiring the anti-self-duality equations to be invariant in three directions, one obtains the Nahm equations on an interval.

There is a duality between solutions of the dimensionally reduced ASD equations on $\mathbb{R}^3$ and $\mathbb{R}$ called the Nahm transform, after Werner Nahm, who first described how to construct monopoles from Nahm equation data. Hitchin showed the converse, and Donaldson proved that solutions to the Nahm equations could further be linked to moduli spaces of rational maps from the complex projective line to itself.

The duality observed for these solutions is theorized to hold for arbitrary dual groups of symmetries of a four-manifold. Indeed there is a similar duality between instantons invariant under dual lattices inside $\mathbb{R}^4$, instantons on dual four-dimensional tori, and the ADHM construction can be thought of as a duality between instantons on $\mathbb{R}^4$ and dual algebraic data over a single point.

Symmetry reductions of the ASD equations also lead to a number of integrable systems, and Ward's conjecture is that in fact all known integrable ODEs and PDEs come from symmetry reduction of ASDYM. For example reductions of SU(2) ASDYM give the sine-Gordon and Korteweg–de Vries equation, of $\mathrm{SL}(3,\mathbb{R})$ ASDYM gives the Tzitzeica equation, and a particular reduction to $2+1$ dimensions gives the integrable chiral model of Ward. In this sense it is a 'master theory' for integrable systems, allowing many known systems to be recovered by picking appropriate parameters, such as choice of gauge group and symmetry reduction scheme. Other such master theories are four-dimensional Chern–Simons theory and the affine Gaudin model.

=== Chern–Simons theory ===
The moduli space of Yang–Mills equations over a compact Riemann surface $\Sigma$ can be viewed as the configuration space of Chern–Simons theory on a cylinder $\Sigma \times [0,1]$. In this case the moduli space admits a geometric quantization, discovered independently by Nigel Hitchin and Axelrod–Della Pietra–Witten.

== See also ==
- Connection (vector bundle)
- Connection (principal bundle)
- Donaldson theory
- Stable Yang–Mills connection
- Yang–Mills flow
- F-Yang–Mills equations
- Bi-Yang–Mills equations
- Hermitian Yang–Mills equations
- Deformed Hermitian Yang–Mills equations
- Yang–Mills–Higgs equations

== Literature ==
- Uhlenbeck, Karen K.; Freed, Daniel S. (1984). Instantons and Four-Manifolds. Mathematical Sciences Research Institute Publications. Vol. 1. Springer. doi:10.1007/978-1-4613-9703-8. ISBN 978-1-4613-9703-8.
- Donaldson, Simon K.; Kronheimer, Peter B. (1990-09-13). The Geometry of Four-Manifolds. Oxford Mathematical Monographs. Oxford University Press. doi:10.1093/oso/9780198535539.001.0001. ISBN 978-0-198-53553-9. MR 1079726.
- Naber, Gregory L. (2011). Topology, Geometry and Gauge Fields. Applied Mathematical Sciences. Vol. 141 (Second ed.). Springer. doi:10.1007/978-1-4419-7895-0. ISBN 978-1-4419-7894-3. ISSN 0066-5452.
