= Uhlenbeck's singularity theorem =

Singularity theorem in Yang–Mills theory

In differential geometry and in particular Yang–Mills theory, Uhlenbeck's singularity theorem is a result allowing the removal of a singularity of a four-dimensional Yang–Mills field with finite energy using gauge. It states as a consequence that Yang–Mills fields with finite energy on flat euclidean space arise from Yang–Mills fields on the curved sphere, its one-point compactification. The theorem is named after Karen Uhlenbeck, who first described it in 1982. In 2019, Uhlenbeck became the first woman to be awarded the Abel Prize, in part for her contributions to partial differential equations and gauge theory. Uhlenbeck's singularity theorem was generalized to higher dimensions by Terence Tao and Gang Tian in 2002.

== Claim ==
For the closed disk $B^n\setminus\{0\} :=\{x\in\mathbb{R}^n|\|x\|\leq 1\}$ and a vector bundle $\eta\twoheadrightarrow B^4\setminus\{0\}$ with structure group $G$, a Yang–Mills connection $A\in\Omega^1(B^4\setminus\{0\},\operatorname{Ad}(\eta))$ with finite energy:

$$\int_{B^4}\|F_A\|^2\mathrm{d}\operatorname{vol}_g<\infty$$

the vector bundle $\eta\twoheadrightarrow B^4\setminus\{0\}$ extends to a smooth vector bundle $\overline\eta\twoheadrightarrow B^4$ and the Yang–Mills connection $A\in\Omega^1(B^4\setminus\{0\},\operatorname{Ad}(\eta))$ extends to a smooth Yang–Mills connection $\overline{A}\in\Omega^1(B^4,\operatorname{Ad}(\overline\eta))$.

== See also ==
- Uhlenbeck's compactness theorem, also first published in the same journal

== Literature ==
- Uhlenbeck, Karen (February 1982). "Removable Singularities in Yang-Mills Fields". Communications in Mathematical Physics. 83 (1): 11–29. Bibcode:1982CMaPh..83...11U. doi:10.1007/BF01947068.
- Tao, Terence; Tian, Gang (2002-09-25). "A singularity removal theorem for Yang-Mills fields in higher dimensions". arXiv:math/0209352.
