= Ronald J. Stern =

American mathematician

Ronald John Stern (born 20 January 1947) is a mathematician who works on topology, geometry, and gauge theory. He is emeritus professor at the University of California, Irvine.

Stern was the first in his family to receive a college education and earned his bachelor's degree in mathematics from Knox College in Galesburg, Illinois. He then earned his Ph.D. in 1973 from the University of California, Los Angeles under the joint supervision of Robert Duncan Edwards (de) and Robert F. Brown.

Before joining the faculty at the University of California, Irvine in 1989, Stern was a professor at the University of Utah and a visiting professor at UCLA and the University of Hawaii.

He was an Invited Speaker at the 1998 International Congress of Mathematicians, in Berlin.

He is a Fellow of the American Mathematical Society.

== Selected papers ==
These are his most cited papers (according to Google Scholar), they are all joint work with Ron Fintushel:

- "Knots, links, and 4-manifolds", Inventiones mathematicae 134 (2), pp. 363–400 (1998)
- "Rational blowdowns of smooth 4-manifolds", Journal of Differential Geometry 46 (2), pp. 181–235 (1997)
- "Instanton homology of Seifert fibred homology three spheres", Proceedings of the London Mathematical Society 61 (3), pp. 109–137 (1990)
- "Immersed spheres in 4-manifolds and the immersed Thom conjecture", Turkish Journal of Mathematics 19 (2), pp. 145–157 (1995)
- "Pseudofree orbifolds", Annals of Mathematics, pp. 335–364 (1985)
- "Constructing lens spaces by surgery on knots", Mathematische Zeitschrift 175 (1), pp. 33–51 (1980)
- "The blowup formula for Donaldson invariants", Annals of Mathematics 143 (3), pp. 529–546 (1996)

== See also ==
- Fintushel–Stern knot
