= Ronald Fintushel =

American mathematician

Ronald Alan Fintushel (born 1945) is an American mathematician, specializing in low-dimensional geometric topology (specifically of 4-manifolds) and the mathematics of gauge theory.

== Education and career ==
Fintushel studied mathematics at Columbia University with a bachelor's degree in 1967 and at the University of Illinois at Urbana–Champaign with a master's degree in 1969. In 1975 he received his Ph.D. from the State University of New York at Binghamton with thesis Orbit maps of local $S^1$-actions on manifolds of dimension less than five under the supervision of Louis McAuley. Fintushel was a professor at Tulane University and is a professor at Michigan State University.

His research deals with geometric topology, in particular of 4-manifolds (including the computation of Donaldson and Seiberg-Witten invariants) with links to gauge theory, knot theory, and symplectic geometry. He works closely with Ronald J. Stern.

In 1998 he was an Invited Speaker, with Ronald J. Stern, with talk Construction of smooth 4-manifolds at the International Congress of Mathematicians in Berlin. In 1997 Fintushel received the Distinguished Faculty Award from Michigan State University. In 2016 a conference was held in his honor at Tulane University.

He was elected a Fellow of the American Mathematical Society. Fintushel is a member of the editorial boards of Geometry & Topology and the Michigan Mathematical Journal.

== Selected publications ==
- with Stern: Constructing lens spaces by surgery on knots, Mathematische Zeitschrift, vol. 175, 1980, pp. 33–51
- with Stern: An exotic free involution of $S^4$, Annals of Mathematics, vol. 113, 1981, pp. 357–365
- with Stern: Pseudofree orbifolds, Annals of Mathematics, vol. 122, 1985, pp. 335–364
- with Stern: Instanton homology of Seifert fibred homology three spheres, Proceedings of the London Mathematical Society, vol. 61, 1990, pp. 109–137
- with Stern: Immersed spheres in 4-manifolds and the immersed Thom conjecture, Turkish Journal of Mathematics, vol. 19, 1995, pp. 145–157
- with Stern: Donaldson invariants of 4-manifolds with simple type, J. Diff. Geom., vol. 42, 1995, pp. 577–633
- with Stern: The blowup formula for Donaldson invariants, Annals of Mathematics, vol. 143, 1996, pp. 529–546 arXiv
- with Stern: Rational blowdowns of smooth 4-manifolds, Journal of Differential Geometry, vol. 46, 1997, pp. 181–235 arXiv
- with Stern: Surfaces in 4-manifolds, Math. Res. Letters, vol. 4, 1997, pp. 907–914 arXiv
- with Stern: Knots, links, and 4-manifolds, Inventiones mathematicae, vol. 134, 1998, pp. 363–400, arXiv
- with Stern: Constructions of smooth 4-manifolds. Proceedings of the International Congress of Mathematicians, Vol. II (Berlin, 1998). Doc. Math. 1998, Extra Vol. II, 443–452
- with Stern: Symplectic surfaces in a fixed homology class, J. Diff. Geom., vol. 52, 2000, pp. 203–222
- with Stern: Families of simply connected 4-manifolds with the same Seiberg-Witten invariants, Topology, vol. 43, 2004, pp. 1449–1467
- with Stern: Invariants for Lagrangian tori, Geom. Topol., vol. 8, 2004, pp., 947-968 arXiv
- with Stern: Tori in symplectic 4-manifolds, Geometry and Topology Monographs, vol. 7, 2004, Proceedings of the Casson Fest, pp. 311–333
- with Stern, B. D. Park: Reverse engineering small 4-manifolds, Algebraic & Geometric Topology, vol. 7, 2007, pp. 2103–2116 arXiv
- with Stern: Six Lectures on Four 4-manifolds, Low dimensional topology, IAS/Park City Math. Ser. 15, Amer. Math. Soc., Providence, RI, 2009, pp. 265–315

== See also ==
- Fintushel–Stern knot
