= Dan Freed =

American mathematician

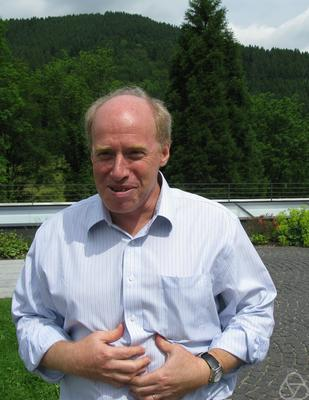
Freed at Oberwolfach in 2010

Daniel Stuart Freed (born 17 April 1959) is an American mathematician, specializing in global analysis and its applications to supersymmetry, string theory, and quantum field theory. He is currently the Shiing-Shen Chern Professor of Mathematics at Harvard University.

== Education and career ==
Freed studied at Harvard University, where he received his bachelor's and master's degrees in 1981. He received his Ph.D. from the University of California, Berkeley in 1985 with thesis The geometry of loop groups under Isadore Singer. As a postdoc, Freed was a Moore Instructor at the Massachusetts Institute of Technology, and then became an assistant professor at the University of Chicago. Beginning in 1989, he was an associate professor, and from 1994, a professor at the University of Texas at Austin. From 1996 to 1998, he was at the Institute for Advanced Study (IAS) and he was a visiting scientist at the Institut des Hautes Études Scientifiques (1995, 1999). From 1989 to 2022, he was a professor at the University of Texas at Austin.

In the academic year 2002/2003, Freed was a Guggenheim Fellow, and from 1988 to 1992, a Sloan Fellow. In 2002, he was an invited speaker at the International Congress of Mathematicians in Beijing (Twisted K-theory and loop groups). He is one of the founders of the IAS/Park City Mathematics Institute and is, since 2006, a member of the board of trustees of the Mathematical Sciences Research Institute, where he has belonged to the scientific advisory board since 2002. He is a Fellow of the American Mathematical Society.

== Works ==
- Quantum fields and strings: a course for mathematicians. Vol. 1, 2. Material from the Special Year on Quantum Field Theory held at the Institute for Advanced Study, Princeton, NJ, 1996–1997. Edited by Pierre Deligne, Pavel Etingof, Daniel S. Freed, Lisa C. Jeffrey, David Kazhdan, John W. Morgan, David R. Morrison and Edward Witten. American Mathematical Society, Providence, RI; Institute for Advanced Study (IAS), Princeton, NJ, 1999. Vol. 1: xxii+723 pp.; Vol. 2: pp. i--xxiv and 727–1501. ISBN 0-8218-1198-3, 81-06 (81T30 81Txx)
- Quantum field theory, supersymmetry, and enumerative geometry. Freed, Daniel S. and Morrison, David R. and Singer, Isadore editors. IAS/Park City Mathematics Series, Vol. 11. American Mathematical Society Providence, RI viii+285. Papers from the Graduate Summer School of the IAS/Park City Mathematics Institute held in Princeton, NJ, 2001. (2006)
- editor with Karen Uhlenbeck: Geometry and Quantum Field Theory, American Mathematical Society 1995
- Uhlenbeck, Karen K.; Freed, Daniel S. (1984). Instantons and Four-Manifolds. Mathematical Sciences Research Institute Publications. Vol. 1. Springer. doi:10.1007/978-1-4613-9703-8. ISBN 978-1-4613-9703-8.
- Five lectures on supersymmetry, American Mathematical Society 1999
- Constructed the Quillen metric for a family of elliptic operators with Jean-Michel Bismut.
