= Karen Uhlenbeck =

American mathematician (born 1942)

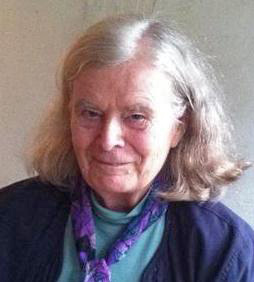
- Uhlenbeck in 2019
- Born: Karen Keskulla; August 24, 1942 (age 84); Cleveland, Ohio, U.S.
- Education: University of Michigan, Ann Arbor (BA); New York University; Brandeis University (MA, PhD)
- Known for: Uhlenbeck's singularity theorem Uhlenbeck's compactness theorem Calculus of variations Geometric analysis Minimal surfaces Yang–Mills theory
- Spouses: Olke C. Uhlenbeck (m. 1965–1976); Robert F. Williams (m. ? – present)
- Awards: MacArthur Fellowship; Noether Lecturer (1988); National Medal of Science (2000); Leroy P. Steele Prize (2007); Abel Prize (2019); Leroy P. Steele Prize (2020)
- Scientific career
- Fields: Mathematics
- Workplaces: Institute for Advanced Study; University of Texas, Austin; University of Chicago; University of Illinois, Chicago; University of Illinois, Urbana-Champaign
- Thesis: The calculus of variations and global analysis (1968)
- Doctoral advisor: Richard Palais

Karen Keskulla Uhlenbeck ForMemRS (born August 24, 1942) is an American mathematician and one of the founders of modern geometric analysis. She is a professor emerita of mathematics at the University of Texas at Austin, where she held the Sid W. Richardson Foundation Regents Chair. She is currently a distinguished visiting professor at the Institute for Advanced Study and a visiting senior research scholar at Princeton University.

Uhlenbeck was elected to the American Philosophical Society in 2007. She won the 2019 Abel Prize for "her pioneering achievements in geometric partial differential equations, gauge theory, and integrable systems, and for the fundamental impact of her work on analysis, geometry and mathematical physics." She is the first, and so far only, woman to win the prize since its inception in 2003. She donated half of the prize money to organizations which promote more engagement of women and other minorities in research mathematics.

== Life and career ==
Uhlenbeck was born in Cleveland, Ohio, to engineer Arnold Keskulla and schoolteacher and artist Carolyn Windeler Keskulla. While she was a child, the family moved to New Jersey. Uhlenbeck's maiden name, Keskulla, comes from Keskküla and from her grandfather who was Estonian, while her current surname is Dutch. Uhlenbeck received her B.A. (1964) from the University of Michigan. She began her graduate studies at the Courant Institute of Mathematical Sciences at New York University, and married biophysicist Olke C. Uhlenbeck (the son of physicist George Uhlenbeck) in 1965. When her husband went to Harvard, she moved with him and restarted her studies at Brandeis University, where she earned an MA (1966) and PhD (1968) under the supervision of Richard Palais. Her doctoral dissertation was titled The Calculus of Variations and Global Analysis.

After temporary jobs at the Massachusetts Institute of Technology and University of California, Berkeley, and having difficulty finding a permanent position with her husband because of the "anti-nepotism" rules then in place that prevented hiring both a husband and wife even in distinct departments of a university, she took a faculty position at the University of Illinois at Urbana–Champaign in 1971. However, she disliked Urbana and moved to the University of Illinois at Chicago in 1976 as well as separating from her first husband Olke Uhlenbeck in the same year. From 1979 to 1981 Uhlenbeck served on the Council of the AMS as a Member at Large. She moved again to the University of Chicago in 1983. In 1988, by which time she had married mathematician Robert F. Williams, she moved to the University of Texas at Austin as the Sid W. Richardson Foundation Regents Chairholder. Uhlenbeck is currently a professor emerita at the University of Texas at Austin, a visiting associate at the Institute for Advanced Study and a visiting senior research scholar at Princeton University.

== Research ==
Uhlenbeck is one of the founders of the field of geometric analysis, a discipline that uses differential geometry to study the solutions to differential equations and vice versa. She has also contributed to topological quantum field theory and integrable systems.

Together with Jonathan Sacks in the early 1980s, Uhlenbeck established regularity estimates that have found applications to studies of the singularities of harmonic maps and the existence of smooth local solutions to the Yang–Mills–Higgs equations in gauge theory.^{[EMI]}^{[MIC]}^{[RSY]} In particular, Simon Donaldson describes their joint 1981 paper The existence of minimal immersions of 2-spheres^{[EMI]} as a "landmark paper... which showed that, with a deeper analysis, variational arguments can still be used to give general existence results" for harmonic map equations. Building on these ideas, Uhlenbeck initiated a systematic study of the moduli theory of minimal surfaces in hyperbolic 3-manifolds (also called minimal submanifold theory) in her 1983 paper, Closed minimal surfaces in hyperbolic 3-manifolds.^{[CMS]}

In particular, her work is described by Simon Donaldson in a survey of Yang–Mills geometry as foundational in the analytic aspects of the calculus of variations associated with the Yang–Mills functional. A wider survey of her contributions to the field of calculus of variations was published by Simon Donaldson in the March 2019 issue of Notices of the American Mathematical Society; Donaldson describes the work of Uhlenbeck, along with Shing-Tung Yau, Richard Schoen and several others, as developing a...

...whole circle of ideas and techniques involving the dimension of singular sets, monotonicity, 'small energy' results, tangent cones, etc. [that] has had a wide-ranging impact in many branches of differential geometry over the past few decades and forms the focus of much current research activity.

== Outreach ==
In 1991, Uhlenbeck co-founded, with Herbert Clemens and Dan Freed, the Park City Mathematics Institute (PCMI) with the mission to "provide an immersive educational and professional development opportunity for several parallel communities from across the larger umbrella of the mathematics profession." Uhlenbeck also co-founded the Women and Mathematics Program at the Institute for Advanced Study "with the mission to recruit and retain more women in mathematics." British theoretical physicist and author Jim Al-Khalili describes Uhlenbeck as a "role model" for her work in promoting a career in mathematics to young people, particularly women.

== Personal life ==
Uhlenbeck is a self-described "messy reader" and "messy thinker", with boxes of books stacked on her desk at Princeton's Institute for Advanced Study. In spontaneous remarks made to Institute colleagues after winning the Abel Prize in March 2019, Uhlenbeck noted that for lack of prominent female role models during her apprenticeship in the field of mathematics, she had instead emulated chef Julia Child: "She knew how to pick the turkey up off the floor and serve it".

== Awards and honors ==
In March 2019, Uhlenbeck became the first woman to receive the Abel Prize, with the award committee citing the decision for "her pioneering achievements in geometric partial differential equations, gauge theory and integrable systems, and for the fundamental impact of her work on analysis, geometry and mathematical physics." Hans Munthe-Kaas, who chaired the award committee, stated that "Her theories have revolutionised our understanding of minimal surfaces, such as more general minimisation problems in higher dimensions". She donated half of the cash prize to two organizations, the EDGE Foundation (which subsequently set up the Karen EDGE Fellowship Program), and the Institute for Advanced Study's Women and Mathematics (WAM) Program.

Uhlenbeck also won the National Medal of Science in 2000, and the Leroy P. Steele Prize for Seminal Contribution to Research of the American Mathematical Society in 2007, "for her foundational contributions in analytic aspects of mathematical gauge theory", based on her 1982 papers "Removable singularities in Yang–Mills fields"^{[RSY]} and "Connections with bounds on curvature".^{[CLP]} She became a MacArthur Fellow in 1983 and a Fellow of the American Academy of Arts and Sciences in 1985. She was elected as a member of the National Academy of Sciences in 1986. She became a Guggenheim Fellow in 2001, an honorary member of the London Mathematical Society in 2008, and a Fellow of the American Mathematical Society in 2012.

The Association for Women in Mathematics included her in the 2020 class of AWM Fellows for "her groundbreaking and profound contributions to modern geometric analysis; for establishing a career as one of the greatest mathematicians of our time, despite the considerable challenges facing women when she entered the field; for using her experiences navigating these challenges to create and sustain programs to address them for future generations of women. For a lifetime of breaking barriers; and for being the first woman to win the Abel Prize".

She was the Noether Lecturer of the Association for Women in Mathematics in 1988. In 1990, she was a plenary speaker at the International Congress of Mathematicians, as only the second woman (after Emmy Noether) to give such a lecture.

Her other awards include the University of Michigan alumna of the year (1984), the Sigma Xi Common Wealth Award for Science and Technology (1995), and honorary doctorates from the University of Illinois at Urbana–Champaign (2000), Ohio State University (2001), University of Michigan (2004), Harvard University (2007), and Princeton University (2012).

== Selected publications ==
=== Books ===
I4M.	Freed, Daniel S.; Uhlenbeck, Karen K. (1984). Instantons and Four-Manifolds. Mathematical Sciences Research Institute Publications. Vol. 1. Springer-Verlag, New York. doi:10.1007/978-1-4684-0258-2. ISBN 0-387-96036-8. 2nd ed., 1991. Translated into Russian by Yu. P. Solovyev, Mir, 1988.

=== Research articles ===
RNL.	Uhlenbeck, Karen (1977). "Regularity for a class of non-linear elliptic systems". Acta Mathematica. 138 (3–4): 219–240. doi:10.1007/bf02392316. MR 0474389. S2CID 11166753.

EMI.	Sacks, Jonathan; Uhlenbeck, Karen (1981). "The existence of minimal immersions of 2-spheres" (PDF). Annals of Mathematics. Second Series. 113 (1): 1–24. doi:10.2307/1971131. JSTOR 1971131. MR 0604040.

MIC.	Sacks, J.; Uhlenbeck, K. (1982). "Minimal immersions of closed Riemann surfaces" (PDF). Transactions of the American Mathematical Society. 271 (2): 639–652. doi:10.1090/s0002-9947-1982-0654854-8. JSTOR 1998902. MR 0654854. Archived from the original (PDF) on August 27, 2017.

RSY.	Uhlenbeck, Karen K. (1982). "Removable singularities in Yang–Mills fields". Communications in Mathematical Physics. 83 (1): 11–29. Bibcode:1982CMaPh..83...11U. doi:10.1007/bf01947068. MR 0648355. S2CID 122376700. Announced in the Bulletin of the American Mathematical Society 1 (3): 579–581, MR 0526970

CLP.	Uhlenbeck, Karen K. (1982). "Connections with $L^p$ bounds on curvature". Communications in Mathematical Physics. 83 (1): 31–42. Bibcode:1982CMaPh..83...31U. doi:10.1007/bf01947069. MR 0648356. S2CID 124912932.

RHM.	Schoen, Richard; Uhlenbeck, Karen (1982). "A regularity theory for harmonic maps". Journal of Differential Geometry. 17 (2): 307–335. doi:10.4310/jdg/1214436923. MR 0664498.

CMS.	Uhlenbeck, Karen K. (1983). "Closed minimal surfaces in hyperbolic 3-manifolds". In Bombieri, Enrico (ed.). Seminar on Minimal Submanifolds. Annals of Mathematics Studies. Vol. 103. Princeton University Press. pp. 147–168. ISBN 9780691083247. JSTOR j.ctt1b7x7tv.10. MR 0795233.

EHY.	Uhlenbeck, Karen; Yau, Shing-Tung (1986). "On the existence of Hermitian-Yang-Mills connections in stable vector bundles". Communications on Pure and Applied Mathematics. 39: S257–S293. doi:10.1002/cpa.3160390714. MR 0861491.

HML.	Uhlenbeck, Karen (1989). "Harmonic maps into Lie groups: classical solutions of the chiral model". Journal of Differential Geometry. 30 (1): 1–50. doi:10.4310/jdg/1214443286. MR 1001271.

HMY.	Uhlenbeck, Karen (1992). "On the connection between harmonic maps and the self-dual Yang-Mills and the sine-Gordon equations". Journal of Geometry and Physics. 8 (1–4): 283–316. Bibcode:1992JGP.....8..283U. doi:10.1016/0393-0440(92)90053-4. MR 1165884.

== See also ==
- Timeline of women in mathematics
- Timeline of women in science
