= Rotation number (knot theory) =

Concept in contact topology

In the mathematical theory of knots, the rotation number is an invariant associated with knots that are adapted to a contact structure, such as Legendrian and transverse knots, in a three-dimensional contact manifold. It measures the twisting of the knot's tangent direction relative to the contact structure. Together for the Thurston–Bennequin number for Legendrian knots, it is often referred to as a "classical" invariant of Legendrian knots.

The rotation number of a knot $K$ is commonly denoted by $\operatorname{rot}(K)$ or $r(K)$.

== Definition and properties for Legendrian knots ==
Let $K$ be a null-homologous oriented Legendrian knot in a co-oriented contact three-manifold $(M,\xi)$ and fix a Seifert surface $\Sigma$ for $K$, that is an embedded connected, compact, orientable surface with boundary $\partial \Sigma = K$. The rotation number $\operatorname{rot}(K,\Sigma)\in \mathbb{Z}$ of $K$ relative to $\Sigma$ is defined as the winding number of a positive tangent vector field to $K$ with respect to a trivialization of $\xi$ over $\Sigma$. This definition can be extended to Legendrian knots with other topological types.

One shows that $\operatorname{rot}(K,\Sigma)$ only depends on the class $[\Sigma]\in H^2(M,K)$ associated with the surface $\Sigma$. Moreover, whenever the Euler class $e(\xi)$ of the contact structure vanishes, the rotation number is independent of the above choice and is hence denoted $rot(K)$. The rotation number is invariant under Legendrian isotopy.

=== The Euclidean case ===
We consider the case where $(M,\xi)=(\mathbb{R}^3,\xi_{\mathrm{std}})$ is the standard contact structure on $\mathbb{R}^3$.

A theorem due to Eliashberg-Fraser asserts that two Legendrian knots that are topologically the unknot in $(\mathbb{R}^3,\xi_{\mathrm{std}})$ are Legendrian isotopic if and only if their classical invariants agree. Note that this classification theorem does not hold for general topological types.

==== Front projection description ====
The rotation number of a Legendrian knot $K$ can be computed combinatorially from the front projection. It is given by

$$\operatorname{rot}(K)=\tfrac{1}{2}\bigl(\#\text{downward cusps}-\#\text{upward cusps}\bigr),$$

where cusps are counted with respect to the orientation of the knot.

==== Lagrangian projection description ====
The rotation number of a knot in $(\mathbb{R}^3,\xi_{\mathrm{std}})$ is related to the classical notion of rotation number as follows. Let $i\colon S^1\to \mathbb{R}^3$ be a parametrization of a knot $K$. Then

$$\operatorname{rot}(K)=\operatorname{rot}(\pi_L\circ i),$$

where $\pi_L\colon \mathbb{R}^3\to \mathbb{R}^2$ is the standard Lagrangian projection to the first two coordinates.
