= Relative contact homology =

In mathematics, in the area of symplectic topology, relative contact homology is an invariant of spaces together with a chosen subspace. Namely, it is associated to a contact manifold and one of its Legendrian submanifolds. It is a part of a more general invariant known as symplectic field theory, and is defined using pseudoholomorphic curves.

== Legendrian knots ==
The simplest case yields invariants of Legendrian knots inside contact three-manifolds. The relative contact homology has been shown to be a strictly more powerful invariant than the "classical invariants", namely Thurston-Bennequin number and rotation number (within a class of smooth knots).

Yuri Chekanov developed a purely combinatorial version of relative contact homology for Legendrian knots, i.e. a combinatorially defined invariant that reproduces the results of relative contact homology.

Tamas Kalman developed a combinatorial invariant for loops of Legendrian knots, with which he detected differences between the fundamental groups of the space of smooth knots and of the space of Legendrian knots.

== Higher-dimensional legendrian submanifolds ==
In the work of Lenhard Ng, relative SFT is used to obtain invariants of smooth knots: a knot or link inside a topological three-manifold gives rise to a Legendrian torus inside a contact five-manifold, consisisting of the unit conormal bundle to the knot inside the unit cotangent bundle of the ambient three-manifold. The relative SFT of this pair is a differential graded algebra; Ng derives a powerful knot invariant from a combinatorial version of the zero-th degree part of the homology. It has the form of a finitely presented tensor algebra over a certain ring of multivariable Laurent polynomials with integer coefficients. This invariant assigns distinct invariants to (at least) knots of at most ten crossings, and dominates the Alexander polynomial and the A-polynomial (and thus distinguishes the unknot).

== See also ==
- Relative homology
