= Trivial cylinder =

In geometry and topology, trivial cylinders are certain pseudoholomorphic curves appearing in certain cylindrical manifolds.

In Floer homology and its variants, chain complexes or differential graded algebras are generated by certain combinations of closed orbits of vector fields. In symplectic Floer homology, one considers the Hamiltonian vector field of a Hamiltonian function on a symplectic manifold; in symplectic field theory, contact homology, and their variants, one considers the Reeb vector field associated to a contact form, or more generally a stable Hamiltonian structure.

The differentials all count some flavor of pseudoholomorphic curves in a manifold with a cylindrical almost-complex structure whose ends at negative infinity are the given collection of closed orbits. For instance, in symplectic Floer homology, one considers the product of the mapping torus of a symplectomorphism with the real numbers; in symplectic field theory, one considers the symplectization of a contact manifold.

The product of a given embedded closed orbit with R is always a pseudoholomorphic curve, and such a curve is called a trivial cylinder. Trivial cylinders do not generally contribute to the aforementioned differentials, but they may appear as components of more complicated curves which do.
