= Weinstein conjecture =

Conjecture in symplectic geometry

In mathematics, the Weinstein conjecture refers to a general existence problem for periodic orbits of Hamiltonian or Reeb vector flows. More specifically, the conjecture claims that on a compact contact manifold, its Reeb vector field should carry at least one periodic orbit.

By definition, a level set of contact type admits a contact form obtained by contracting the Hamiltonian vector field into the symplectic form. In this case, the Hamiltonian flow is a Reeb vector field on that level set. It is a fact that any contact manifold (M,α) can be embedded into a canonical symplectic manifold, called the symplectization of M, such that M is a contact type level set (of a canonically defined Hamiltonian) and the Reeb vector field is a Hamiltonian flow. That is, any contact manifold can be made to satisfy the requirements of the Weinstein conjecture. Since, as is trivial to show, any orbit of a Hamiltonian flow is contained in a level set, the Weinstein conjecture is a statement about contact manifolds.

It has been known that any contact form is isotopic to a form that admits a closed Reeb orbit; for example, for any contact manifold there is a compatible open book decomposition, whose binding is a closed Reeb orbit. This is not enough to prove the Weinstein conjecture, though, because the Weinstein conjecture states that every contact form admits a closed Reeb orbit, while an open book determines a closed Reeb orbit for a form which is only isotopic to the given form.

The conjecture was formulated in 1978 by Alan Weinstein. In several cases, the existence of a periodic orbit was known. For instance, Rabinowitz showed that on star-shaped level sets of a Hamiltonian function on a symplectic manifold, there were always periodic orbits (Weinstein independently proved the special case of convex level sets). Weinstein observed that the hypotheses of several such existence theorems could be subsumed in the condition that the level set be of contact type. (Weinstein's original conjecture included the condition that the first de Rham cohomology group of the level set is trivial; this hypothesis turned out to be unnecessary).

The Weinstein conjecture was first proved for contact hypersurfaces in $\mathbb R^{2n}$ in 1986 by Viterbo, then extended to cotangent bundles by Hofer–Viterbo and to wider classes of aspherical manifolds by Floer–Hofer–Viterbo. The presence of holomorphic spheres was used by Hofer–Viterbo. All these cases dealt with the situation where the contact manifold is a contact submanifold of a symplectic manifold. A new approach without this assumption was discovered in dimension 3 by Hofer and is at the origin of contact homology.

The Weinstein conjecture has now been proven for all closed 3-dimensional manifolds by Clifford Taubes. The proof uses a variant of Seiberg–Witten Floer homology and pursues a strategy analogous to Taubes' proof that the Seiberg-Witten and Gromov invariants are equivalent on a symplectic four-manifold. In particular, the proof provides a shortcut to the closely related program of proving the Weinstein conjecture by showing that the embedded contact homology of any contact three-manifold is nontrivial.

== See also ==
- Seifert conjecture
