= Capped grope =

Construction used in 4-dimensional topology

In mathematics, a grope is a construction used in 4-dimensional topology, introduced by Štan'ko (1971) and named by Cannon (1978) "because of its multitudinous fingers". Capped gropes were used by Freedman (1984) as a substitute for Casson handles, that (unlike Casson handles) work better for non-simply-connected 4-manifolds.

A capped surface in a 4-manifold is roughly a surface together with some 2-disks, called caps, whose boundaries generate the fundamental group of the surface. A capped grope is obtained by repeatedly replacing the caps of a capped surface by another capped surface. Capped surfaces and capped gropes are studied in Freedman & Quinn (1990).
