= Kenmotsu manifold =

Almost-contact manifold

In the mathematical field of differential geometry, a Kenmotsu manifold is an almost-contact manifold endowed with a certain kind of Riemannian metric. They are named after the Japanese mathematician Katsuei Kenmotsu.

== Definitions ==
Let $(M, \varphi, \xi, \eta)$ be an almost-contact manifold. One says that a Riemannian metric $g$ on $M$ is adapted to the almost-contact structure $(\varphi, \xi, \eta)$ if:
$$\begin{align}
g_{ij}\xi^j&=\eta_i\\
g_{pq}\varphi_i^p\varphi_j^q&=g_{ij}-\eta_i\eta_j.
\end{align}$$
That is to say that, relative to $g_p,$ the vector $\xi_p$ has length one and is orthogonal to $\ker \left(\eta_p\right);$ furthermore the restriction of $g_p$ to $\ker \left(\eta_p\right)$ is a Hermitian metric relative to the almost-complex structure $\varphi_p\big\vert_{\ker \left(\eta_p\right)}.$ One says that $(M, \varphi, \xi, \eta, g)$ is an almost-contact metric manifold.

An almost-contact metric manifold $(M, \varphi, \xi, \eta, g)$ is said to be a Kenmotsu manifold if
$$\nabla_i\varphi_j^k=-\eta_j\varphi_i^k-g_{ip}\varphi_j^p\xi^k.$$
