= Neda Bokan =

Serbian mathematician (born 1947)

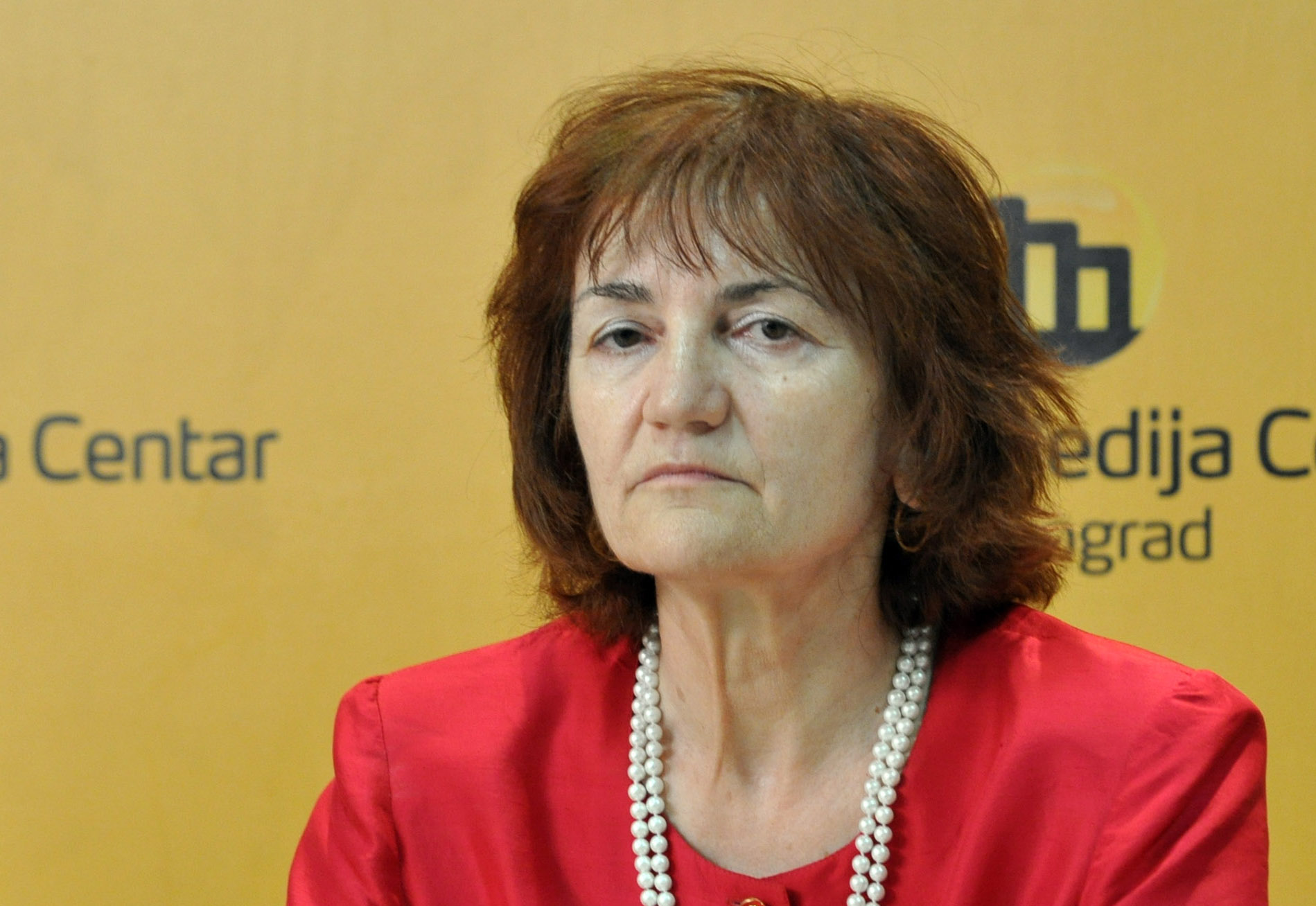
Bokan in 2012

Neda Bokan (born 1947) is a Serbian mathematician specializing in differential geometry.

== Education and career ==
Bokan joined the Mathematical Institute of the Serbian Academy of Sciences and Arts as an assistant in 1969, began working at the University of Belgrade in 1971, and completed a Ph.D. there in 1979, with a dissertation on transformation groups of almost-contact manifolds supervised by Mileva Prvanović.

She eventually became full professor at the University of Belgrade, served as dean of mathematics from 1998 to 2001 and again from 2003 to 2007, and was vice rector for education from 2006 to 2012. She also worked as a full professor at the State University of Novi Pazar from 2012 to 2015. She was president of the National Entity for Accreditation and Quality Assurance in Higher Education until stepping down from that position in 2019.

She is the author of ten textbooks, and in 2013 became editor-in-chief of the journal Matematički Vesnik, the journal of the Mathematical Society of Serbia.
