= Daniel Bennequin =

French mathematician (born 1952)

Daniel Bennequin (3 January 1952) is a French mathematician, known for the Thurston–Bennequin number (sometimes called the Bennequin number) introduced in his doctoral dissertation.

== Education and career ==
Bennequin completed his secondary education at Lycée Condorcet and then graduated from the École normale supérieure. He received his habilitation (Doctoral d'Etat) in 1982 from the University of Paris VII under Alain Chenciner with thesis Entrelacements et équations de Pfaff. He was a professor at the University of Strasbourg before becoming a professor at the University of Paris VII (Institut Mathématique de Jussieu).

Bennequin's dissertation was a major contribution to contact geometry, in which he gave the first example of an exotic contact structure embedded in Euclidean 3-space. On the basis of their work in the 1980s Bennequin and Yakov Eliashberg might be considered the founders of contact topology. Bennequin also works on motion planning. He was a member of Bourbaki.

== Selected publications ==
- L'instanton gordien, d'après P. B. Kronheimer et T. S. Mrowka, Séminaire Bourbaki Nr. 770, 1992/93, numdam
- Monopôles de Seiberg-Witten et conjecture de Thom, d'après Kronheimer, Mrowka et Witten, Séminaire Bourbaki Nr. 807, 1995/96, numdam
- Caustique mystique, d'après Arnold et al., Séminaire Bourbaki, Nr. 634, 1984/85, numdam
- Problèmes elliptiques, surfaces de Riemann et structures symplectiques, d'après M. Gromov, Séminaire Bourbaki, Nr. 657, 1985/86, numdam
- Topologie symplectique, convexité holomorphe et structures de contact, d'après Y. Eliashberg, D. Mc Duff et al, Séminaire Bourbaki, Nr. 725, 1989/90, numdam
- Dualités de champs et de cordes, d'après t'Hooft, Polyakov, Witten et al., Séminaire Bourbaki, Nr. 899, 2001/02, numdam
- Les Bords des revêtements ramifiés des surfaces, ENS 1977
