= Emmanuel Giroux =

French mathematician

Emmanuel Giroux (born 1961) is a blind French geometer known for his research on contact geometry and open book decompositions.

== Education and career ==
Giroux has Marfan syndrome, because of which he became blind at the age of 11. He earned a doctorate from the École Normale Supérieure de Lyon in 1991 under the supervision of François Laudenbach (fr).

He has been the director of the Unit of Mathematics, Pure and Applied (UMPA) at the École normale supérieure de Lyon. In 2015, he left Lyon to co-direct the Unité Mixte International of the Centre national de la recherche scientifique and the Centre de Recherches Mathématiques, in Montreal, Quebec, Canada.

== Mathematical contributions ==
Giroux is known for finding a correspondence (the eponymous Giroux correspondence) between contact structures on three-dimensional manifolds and open book decompositions of those manifolds. This result allows contact geometry to be studied using the tools of low-dimensional topology. It has been called a breakthrough by other mathematicians.

In 2002 he was an invited speaker at the International Congress of Mathematicians.
