= Malus–Dupin theorem =

Theorem in geometrical optics

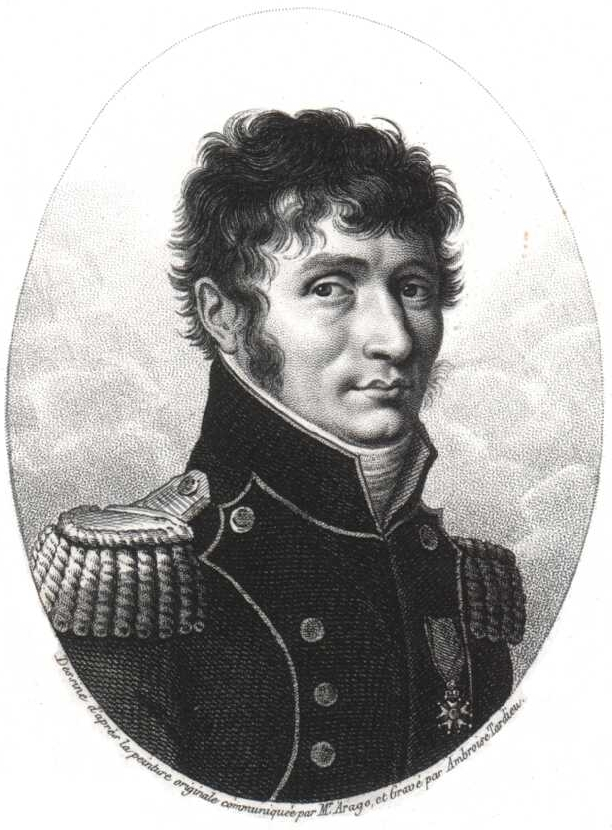
Étienne-Louis Malus

The Malus–Dupin theorem is a theorem in geometrical optics discovered by Étienne-Louis Malus in 1808 and clarified by Charles Dupin in 1822. Hamilton proved it as a simple application of his Hamiltonian optics method.

Consider a pencil of light rays in a homogenous medium that is perpendicular to some surface. Pass the pencil of rays through an arbitrary amount of reflections and refractions, then let it emerge in some other homogenous medium. The theorem states that the resulting pencil of light rays is still perpendicular to some other surface.

== Implications ==
Some ray pencils are not perpendicular to any surface. This is related to contact geometry.

The standard contact structure on R^{3}.

For example, consider the standard contact structure on R^{3}, which can be understood as a field of infinitesimal planes. Now, perpendicular to every infinitesimal plane, draw a light ray. This gives us a "planar twisted" pencil of light rays. There is no surface perpendicular to the pencil, because there is no surface that can be tangent to every infinitesimal plane.

Suppose there is, then draw an infinitesimal square in the x-y plane, and follow the path along the surface. The path would not return to the same z-coordinate after one circuit. Contradiction.

hyperboloid of one sheet for $\varphi=63^\circ$

Similarly, one can nest a sequence of circular pencils, each making up a hyperboloid of one-sheet. The resulting "twisted cylinder" pencil would not be perpendicular to any surface.

Malus–Dupin theorem implies that no amount of reflection and refraction could convert such a pencil of rays into a pencil of parallel rays, or a pencil of rays converging on one point, or any pencil of rays that are perpendicular to a surface.

== Construction and proof ==
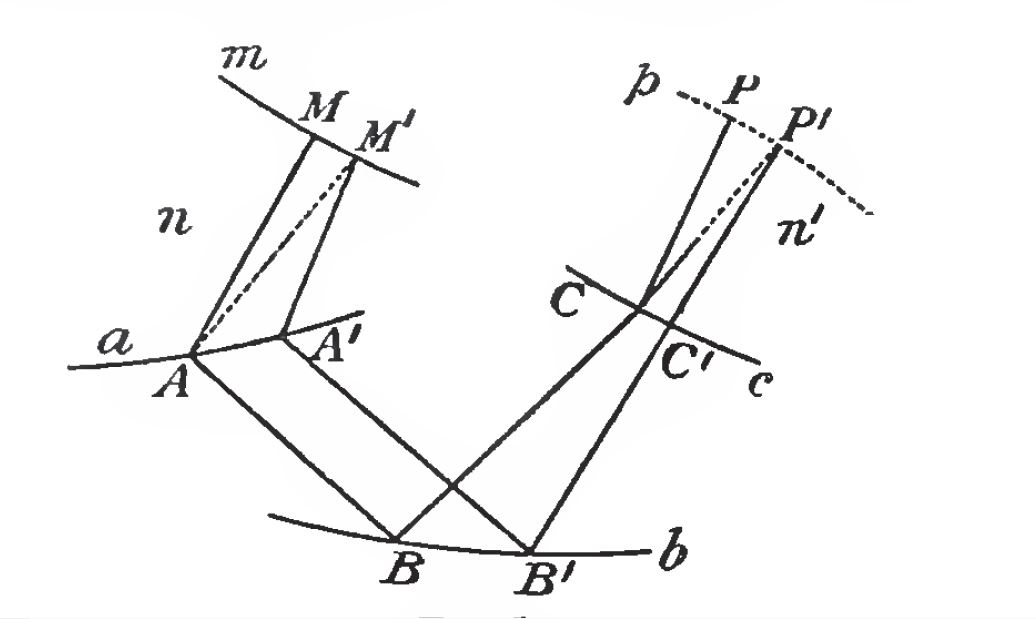
Diagram of the proof

Given a pencil of rays, suppose that the pencil of rays is perpendicular to a surface m at the beginning.

Pass the pencil of rays through an arbitrary system of reflecting and refracting material. For illustration, consider two rays refracted at points A and A'; reflected at points B and B'; and refracted points C and C'.

Now take two rays from the pencil: [MABCP] and [M'A'B'C'P']. Let the two rays be perpendicular to m at points M and M' respectively.

Choose point P' so that [MABCP] and [M'A'B'C'P'] have the same optical path; then the set of all P, P' with equal optical path forms a curved surface p.

Theorem—The surface p is orthogonal to the pencil of rays.

Proof

Take two rays from the pencil: [MABCP] and [M'A'B'C'P'], that are infinitesimally close. Draw line segments M'A and P'C.

Since M'A is perpendicular to surface m, we have [M'A] ~ [MA], thus

[MABCP'] ~ [M'ABCP']

By Fermat's principle,

[M'ABCP']～[M'A'B'C'P']

By construction, [M'A'B'C'P']=[MABCP],

Together, we have

[MABCP']～[MABCP];

which implies [CP'] ~ [CP], thus the surface p is perpendicular to CP at P.

=== Symplectic proof ===
In Hamiltonian optics, there is a more conceptual proof in the style of modern symplectic geometry, which proceeds as follows:

- Construct the 4-dimensional symplectic manifold of oriented lines (light rays).
- If a pencil of light rays is perpendicular to a surface, then this pencil is a Lagrangian submanifold, and vice versa.
- Every refractive and reflective surface is a symplectomorphism on the manifold.
- Symplectomorphisms preserve Lagrangian submanifolds.

Raised one dimension higher, it becomes a proof in contact geometry, as follows:

- Construct the 5-dimensional contact manifold $\R^3 \times \mathbb S^2$ of oriented lines at locations (local light rays).
- If a pencil of light rays is perpendicular to a surface, then this pencil is a Legendrian submanifold, and vice versa.
- Every refractive and reflective surface is a contactomorphism on the manifold.
- Contactomorphisms preserve Legendrian submanifolds.
