= Almost contact manifold =

Geometric structure on a smooth manifold

In the mathematical field of differential geometry, an almost-contact structure is a certain kind of geometric structure on a smooth manifold, obtained by combining a contact-element structure (not necessarily a contact structure) and an almost-complex structure. They can be considered as an odd-dimensional counterpart to almost complex manifolds.

They were introduced by John Gray in 1959. Shigeo Sasaki in 1960 introduced Sasakian manifold to study them.

== Definition ==
Given a smooth manifold $M$, an almost-contact structure is a triple $(Q, J, \xi)$ of a hyperplane distribution $Q$, an almost-complex structure $J$ on $Q$, and a vector field $\xi$ which is transverse to $Q$. That is, for each point $p$ of $M$, one selects a contact element (that is, a codimension-one linear subspace $Q_p$ of the tangent space $T_p M$), a linear complex structure on it (that is, a linear function $J_p : Q_p \to Q_p$ such that $J_p \circ J_p = - \operatorname{id}_{Q_p}$), and an element $\xi_p$ of $T_p M$ which is not contained in $Q_p$. As usual, the selection must be smooth.

Equivalently, one may define an almost-contact structure as a triple $(\xi, \eta, \phi)$, where $\xi$ is a vector field on $M$, $\eta$ is a 1-form on $M$, and $\phi$ is a (1,1)-tensor field on $M$, such that they satisfy the two conditions
$$\phi^2=-\mathrm{id}+\eta \otimes \xi, \quad \eta(\xi)=1 .$$
Or in more detail, for any $p \in M$ and any $v \in T_p M$,

- $\eta_p(v) \xi_p = \phi_p \circ \phi_p(v) + v$
- $\eta_p(\xi_p) = 1$

Because the choice of the transverse vector field $\xi$ is smooth, the field $\xi$ is a co-orientation of the distribution of contact elements $Q$.

More abstractly, it can be defined as a G-structure obtained by reduction of the structure group from $GL(2n+1)$ to $U(n) \times 1$.

=== Equivalence ===
In one direction, given $(\xi, J, Q)$, one can define for each $p$ in $M$ a linear map $\eta_p : T_p M \to \R$ and a linear map $\phi_p : T_p M \to T_p M$ by
$$\begin{align}
\eta_p(u)&=0\text{ if }u\in Q_p\\
\eta_p(\xi_p)&=1\\
\phi_p(u)&=J_p(u)\text{ if }u\in Q_p\\
\phi_p(\xi)&=0.
\end{align}$$
and one can check directly, by decomposing $v$ relative to the direct sum decomposition $T_p M = Q_p \oplus \left\{ k \xi_p : k \in \R \right\}$, that
$$\begin{align}
\eta_p(v) \xi_p &= \phi_p \circ \phi_p(v) + v
\end{align}$$
for any $v$ in $T_p M$.

In another direction, given $(\xi, \eta, \phi)$, one can define $Q_p$ to be the kernel of the linear map $\eta_p$, and one can check that the restriction of $\phi_p$ to $Q_p$ is valued in $Q_p$, thereby defining $J_p$.

=== Properties ===
Given an almost contact structure on a $(2n+1)$-manifold, we have:

- $\phi \xi = 0$
- $\eta \circ \phi = 0$
- $\phi$ has rank 2n.

== Relation to other manifolds ==
=== Metric ===
Given an almost-contact manifold equipped with the previously defined $(Q, J, \xi, \eta, \phi)$, we may add a Riemannian metric $g$ to it. We say the metric is compatible with the almost-contact structure iff the metric satisfies the metric compatibility condition:
$$g(\phi X, \phi Y)=g(X, Y)-\eta(X) \eta(Y) \quad \text { for all } X, Y \in \Gamma(T M) .$$
Such a manifold is called an almost contact metric manifold.

Define the fundamental 2-form $\Phi$ by $\Phi(X, Y)=g(X, \phi Y)$. Then $\Phi$ is skew-symmetric and $\eta(X)= g(X, \xi)$.

Compatible metrics are easy to find. That is, they are not rigid. To construct one, take any metric $k^{\prime}$, and let $k(X, Y)=k^{\prime}\left(\phi^2 X, \phi^2 Y\right)+\eta(X) \eta(Y)$, then this is a compatible metric:
$$g(X, Y)=\frac{1}{2}(k(X, Y)+k(\phi X, \phi Y)+\eta(X) \eta(Y))$$
Special cases used in the literature are:

- Contact metric manifold: additionally $\eta \wedge(d \eta)^n \neq 0$ and $d \eta=2 \Phi$.
- Sasakian manifold: contact metric manifold, with normality condition $N_{\phi}+2 d \eta \otimes \xi=0$.
- Almost coKähler manifold: almost contact metric, with $d \eta=0$ and $d \Phi=0$ (normality not assumed).

==== Classification ====
They have been fully classified via group representation theory into 4096 classes.

Let $(\phi, \xi, \eta, g)$ be an almost contact metric structure on a $(2 n+1)$-manifold, and let $\Phi(X, Y)= g(X, \phi Y)$. At each point, regard
$$T:=\nabla \Phi \in C(V) \subset \otimes^3 T^* M,$$
where
$$\begin{aligned}
C(V)=\{a \mid a(X, Y, Z)&=-a(X, Z, Y), \\
a(X, \phi Y, \phi Z)&=-a(X, Y, Z)+ \eta(Y) a(X, \xi, Z)+\eta(Z) a(X, Y, \xi)\}
\end{aligned}$$
For $n>2$, it splits into orthogonal, irreducible, $U(n) \times 1$-invariant subspaces
$$C(V)=C_1 \oplus C_2 \oplus \cdots \oplus C_{12} .$$
An almost contact metric manifold is of class $U \subset \bigoplus_{i=1}^{12} C_i$ if $T_x \in U$ for all $x$. Hence there are $2^{12}$ classes.

Given such a manifold, it can be classified as follows: compute $\nabla \Phi$, project it onto the twelve $C_i$ (via the formulas in Table III of the paper), and identify the class by which $C_i$ components are nonzero.

Specific cases named in the literature:

- Cosymplectic: $U=\{0\}(d \eta=0, d \Phi=0, \nabla \Phi=0)$.
- Nearly $K$-cosymplectic: $U=C_1$.
- Almost cosymplectic: $U=C_2 \oplus C_9$.
- $\alpha$-Kenmotsu: $U=C_5$.
- $\alpha$-Sasakian: $U=C_6$.
- Trans-Sasakian $(\alpha, \beta): U=C_5 \oplus C_6$.
- Quasi-Sasakian: $U=C_6 \oplus C_7$.

== Examples ==
A cosymplectic structure on a smooth manifold of dimension $2n+1$ induces an almost-contact structure. Specifically, a cosymplectic structure is a tuple $(\eta, \omega)$ where $\eta$ is a closed 1-form, $\omega$ is a closed 2-form, and $\eta \wedge \omega^n \neq 0$ at every point. One way to produce a cosymplectic structure is by foliating the manifold into symplectic manifolds, and set $\omega$ to be the symplectic structure on each manifold, and have $\ker\eta$ parallel to the tangent planes through the foliation.

Another common way to construct a cosymplectic structure is through time-dependent Hamiltonian mechanics. Let a phase space be $M$. A trajectory of a system in phase space is a path in $\R \times M$. Let $p, q$ be canonical coordinates on the phase space, which may be allowed to vary over time. Then $\theta := \sum_i p_i dq_i, \; \omega := d\theta, \; \eta := dt$ provides is an almost-contact structure on the manifold $\R \times M$.

The construction of the almost-contact metric structure:

- $Q=\operatorname{ker} \eta$ (a rank- $2 n$ distribution).
- The Reeb field $\xi$ by $\eta(\xi)=1$ and $\iota_{\xi} \omega=0$ (uniquely determined because $\eta \wedge \omega^n \neq 0$ ).
- Since $\left.\omega\right|_Q$ is symplectic, choose an orientation of $Q$ consistent with $\omega^n$. Then pick any almost-complex structure $J$ on $Q$ that is $\omega$-compatible. In detail, it must satisfy $J^2=-\mathrm{id}$ on $Q$, $\omega(\cdot, J \cdot)$ is a positive-definite bilinear form, and $\omega(J \cdot, J \cdot) = \omega$.
  - Explicitly, if $\R^{2n}$ has symplectic form $\omega = \sum_{i=1}^n dp_i \wedge dq_i$, then $(q, p) \mapsto (-p, q)$ is a $\omega$-compatible complex form on it.
- Set $\left.\phi\right|_Q=J$ and $\phi(\xi)=0$.

To show it, note that
$$\eta(\xi)=1, \quad \eta \circ \phi=0,\left.\quad \phi^2\right|_Q=J^2=-\mathrm{id}_Q, \quad \phi^2(\xi)=0 .$$
Thus $\phi^2=-\mathrm{id}+\eta \otimes \xi$ on all of $T M$. Hence $(\xi, \eta, \phi)$ is an almost-contact structure.
