= Transverse knot =

In mathematics, a transverse knot is a smooth embedding of a circle into a three-dimensional contact manifold such that the tangent vector at every point of the knot is transverse to the contact plane at that point.

Any Legendrian knot can be C^{0}-perturbed in a direction transverse to the contact planes to obtain a transverse knot. This yields a bijection between the set of isomorphism classes of transverse knots and the set of isomorphism classes of Legendrian knots modulo negative Legendrian stabilization.
