= Alain Chenciner =

French mathematician (born 1943)

Alain Chenciner (born 23 October 1943, in Villeneuve-sur-Lot) is a French mathematician, specializing in dynamical systems with applications to celestial mechanics.

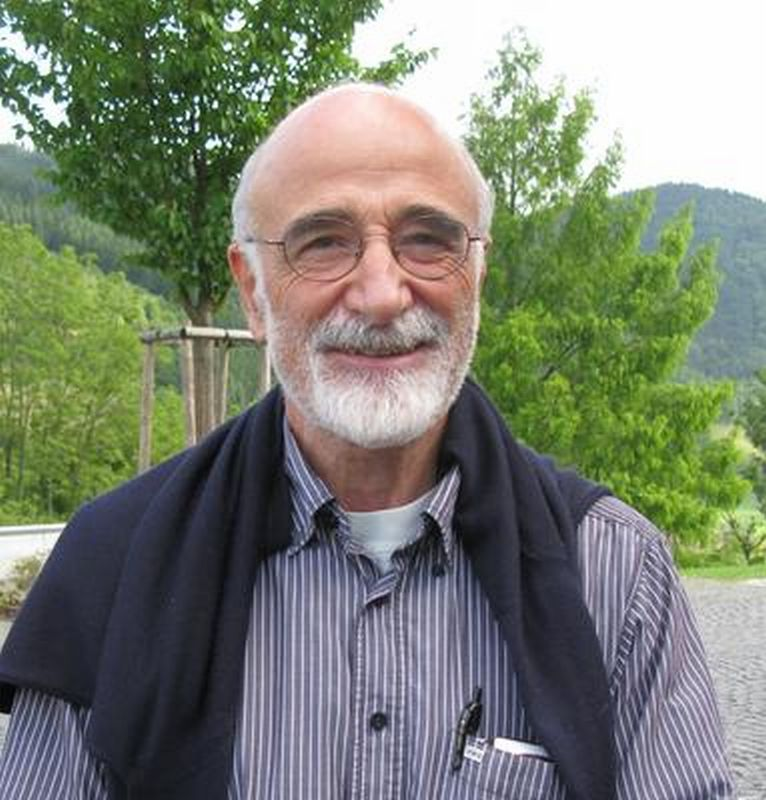
Alain Chenciner, Oberwolfach 2011

Chenciner studied from 1963 to 1965 at the École polytechnique and did research from 1966 for CNRS (Attachée de Recherche) at the École Polytechnique (at the Centre de Mathématiques founded by Laurent Schwartz). In 1971 he received his Ph.D. from the University of Paris XI under Jean Cerf with thesis Sur la géométrie des strates de petites codimensions de l'espace des fonctions différentiables réelles sur une variété (Chenciner's thesis defense involved Henri Cartan, Laurent Schwartz and René Thom). Chenciner became a maître de conférences at the University of Paris XI, then in 1973 at the University of Paris VII, and in 1975 at the University of Nice. He returned in 1978 as maître de conférences to the University of Paris VII, where in 1981 he became professor extraordinarius (professeur de première classe) and in 1991 professor ordinarius (professeur en classe exceptionelle). In 2012 he became professor emeritus.

At the beginning of his career Chenciner worked on differential topology and its applications to dynamical systems, following the pioneering efforts of Stephen Smale, and also worked on singularity theory. Later in his career he worked on mathematical problems of celestial mechanics (specifically, the three-body problem and the n-body problem) and studied bifurcations at elliptical fixed points of dynamical systems.

Chenciner, with Jacques Laskar, founded in 1992 the research group astronomie et systèmes dynamiques at the Observatory of Paris. In 2002 he was an invited speaker at the International Congress of Mathematicians in Beijing and gave a talk Action minimizing solutions of the Newtonian n-body problem: from homology to symmetry. He became in 2012 a fellow of the American Mathematical Society. He gave a eulogy on 9 July 2012 at the Montparnasse Cemetery to mark the centenary of the death of Henri Poincaré.

Chenciner's doctoral students include Daniel Bennequin.

== Selected publications ==
- as editor with Richard Cushman, Clark Robinson, and Zhihong Jeff Xia: Celestial Mechanics, dedicated to Donald Saari for his 60th birthday, Contemporary Mathematics, American Mathematical Society 2002
- Courbes Algébriques Planes, Springer Verlag 2007
- Three Body Problem, Scholarpedia
