= Lenhard Ng =

American mathematician and professor (born 1976)

Lenhard L. Ng
- Born: 1976 (age 49–50)
- Education: Massachusetts Institute of Technology; Harvard University
- Known for: Differential Geometry; Gauge Theory; Legendrian Submanifolds
- Scientific career
- Fields: Mathematics
- Workplaces: Duke University; Mathematical Sciences Research Institute
- Doctoral advisor: Tomasz Mrowka

Lenhard Lee "Lenny" Ng (born 1976) is an American mathematician, working primarily on symplectic geometry. Ng is a professor of mathematics at Duke University.

== Background and education ==
Lenhard Ng is an American of Chinese descent. His father, Yee Jack Ng, is Kenan Professor Emeritus of Physics at University of North Carolina Chapel Hill.

Ng earned his B.A. summa cum laude in Mathematics and Physics from Harvard University in three years and his Ph.D. in Mathematics from the Massachusetts Institute of Technology in 2001.

== Child prodigy ==
Ng was a child prodigy who was once thought to be the "smartest kid in America". At age 10, he earned a perfect score of 800 on the math portion of the SAT, which made him the youngest person to have achieved this feat on his first try. At the age of 11, he earned a perfect score on the College Board Test of Standard Written English. He earned a perfect score on the American High School Mathematics Examination in all 4 years of high school at Chapel Hill High School (Chapel Hill, North Carolina). He attended the Johns Hopkins Center for Talented Youth and was one of the gifted children included in the Study of Mathematically Precocious Youth longitudinal cohort. He was estimated to be one in approximately 30 million of his age-mates.

At the age of 12, he began taking courses (on a part-time basis) at the University of North Carolina, Chapel Hill. He was under the age of 13 when he won the Written Round of the MATHCOUNTS competition. At the age of 14, he participated in the International Mathematical Olympiad and earned a Silver medal. He participated in this competition for the next two years and earned Gold medals. He entered college (Harvard University) full-time at the age of 16 and majored in Mathematics and Physics, graduating summa cum laude in three years. He competed in the William Lowell Putnam Mathematical Competition while at Harvard University and was a three-time fellow (in 1993, 1994, and 1995), one of only 18 people to have achieved this feat since 1938. The first time he became a Putnam Fellow was at the age of 16, making him one of only 6 people (the 5 others being Arthur Rubin, Noam Elkies, Don Zagier, David Ash and John Tillinghast) in the history of the competition to have achieved this feat.

== Mathematical work ==
Ng works in contact and symplectic geometry. His Ph.D. thesis and several other papers concern Legendrian knots, and his best-known work applies symplectic field theory to derive invariants of (topological) knots. More precisely, the conormal bundle of a knot embedded in the three-sphere is a Legendrian torus inside the three-sphere's unit ecosphere bundle (a contact five-manifold). Relative contact homology produces symplectic invariants of this pair, which give topological invariants of the knot. Ng computed the linearized contact homology in this case, providing an entirely combinatorial model for it which is a powerful knot invariant.

== Recognition ==
He was included in the 2019 class of fellows of the American Mathematical Society "for contributions to Floer homology and low-dimensional topology and service to the mathematical community".

== Personal life ==
Ng is married to Astrid Adele Giugni, currently a lecturer of intersectional studies with a focus on NLP methodologies also at Duke.
