= Floer homology =

Symplectic topology tool

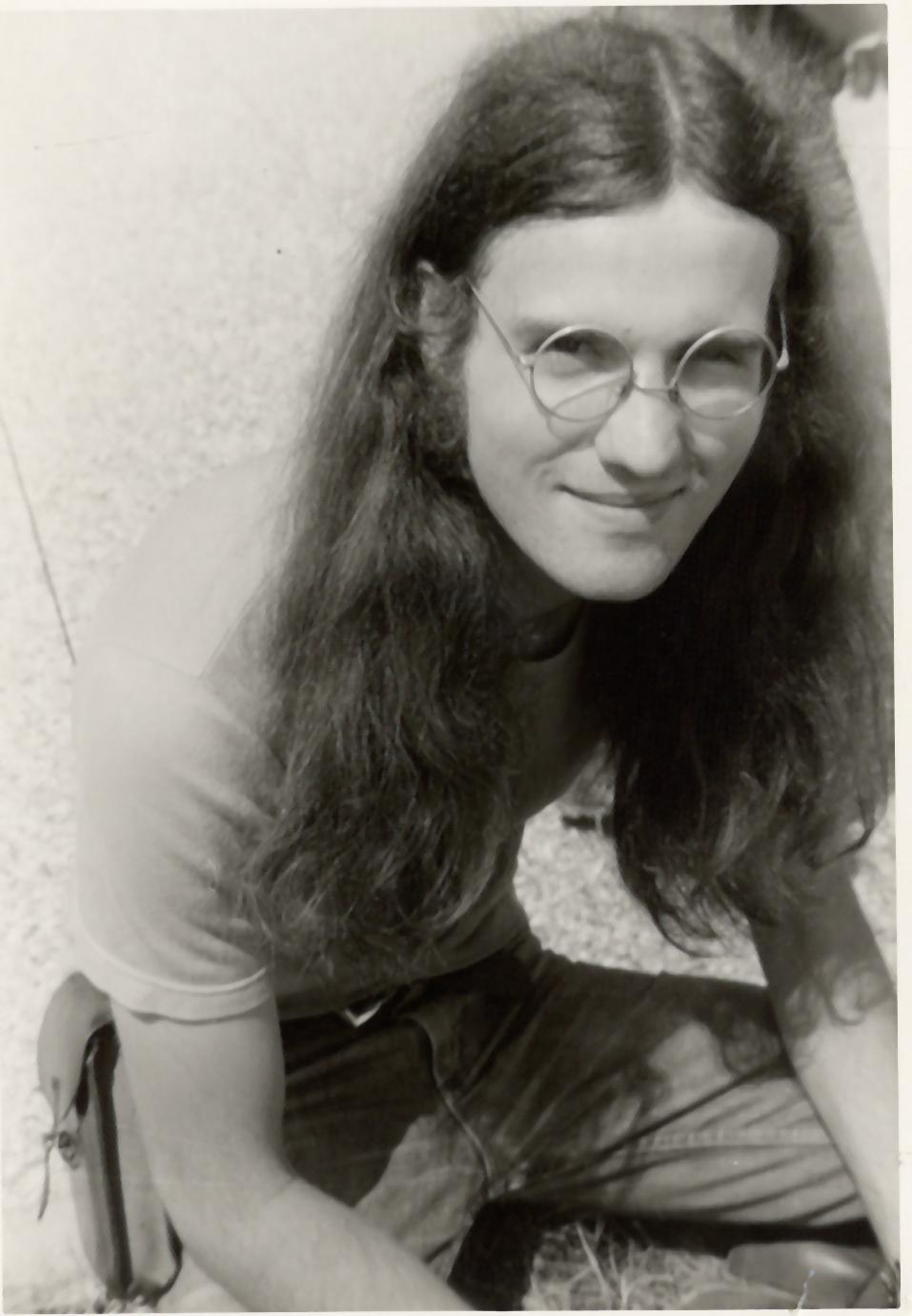
Andreas Floer introduced symplectic Floer homology in his 1988 proof of the Arnold conjecture.

In mathematics, Floer homology is a tool for studying symplectic geometry and low-dimensional topology. Floer homology is an invariant that arises as an infinite-dimensional analogue of finite-dimensional Morse homology. Andreas Floer introduced the first version of Floer homology, now called symplectic Floer homology, in his 1988 proof of the Arnold conjecture in symplectic geometry. Floer also developed a closely related theory for Lagrangian submanifolds of a symplectic manifold. A third construction, also due to Floer, associates homology groups to closed three-dimensional manifolds using the Yang–Mills functional. These constructions and their descendants play a fundamental role in current investigations into the topology of symplectic and contact manifolds as well as (smooth) three- and four-dimensional manifolds.

Floer homology is typically defined by associating to the object of interest an infinite-dimensional manifold and a real valued function on it. In the symplectic version, this is the free loop space of a symplectic manifold with the symplectic action functional. For the (instanton) version for three-manifolds, it is the space of SU(2)-connections on a three-dimensional manifold with the Chern–Simons functional. Loosely speaking, Floer homology is the Morse homology of the function on the infinite-dimensional manifold. A Floer chain complex is formed from the abelian group spanned by the critical points of the function (or possibly certain collections of critical points). The differential of the chain complex is defined by counting the flow lines of the function's gradient vector field connecting fixed pairs of critical points (or collections thereof). Floer homology is the homology of this chain complex.

The gradient flow line equation, in a situation where Floer's ideas can be successfully applied, is typically a geometrically meaningful and analytically tractable equation. For symplectic Floer homology, the gradient flow equation for a path in the loopspace is (a perturbed version of) the Cauchy–Riemann equation for a map of a cylinder (the total space of the path of loops) to the symplectic manifold of interest; solutions are known as pseudoholomorphic curves. The Gromov compactness theorem is then used to show that the counts of flow lines defining the differential are finite, so that the differential is well-defined and squares to zero. Thus the Floer homology is defined. For instanton Floer homology, the gradient flow equation is exactly the Yang–Mills equation on the three-manifold crossed with the real line.

== Symplectic Floer homology ==
Symplectic Floer Homology (SFH) is a homology theory associated to a symplectic manifold and a nondegenerate symplectomorphism of it. If the symplectomorphism is Hamiltonian, the homology arises from studying the symplectic action functional on the (universal cover of the) free loop space of a symplectic manifold. SFH is invariant under Hamiltonian isotopy of the symplectomorphism.

Here, nondegeneracy means that 1 is not an eigenvalue of the derivative of the symplectomorphism at any of its fixed points. This condition implies that the fixed points are isolated. SFH is the homology of the chain complex generated by the fixed points of such a symplectomorphism, where the differential counts certain pseudoholomorphic curves in the product of the real line and the mapping torus of the symplectomorphism. This itself is a symplectic manifold of dimension two greater than the original manifold. For an appropriate choice of almost complex structure, punctured holomorphic curves (of finite energy) in it have cylindrical ends asymptotic to the loops in the mapping torus corresponding to fixed points of the symplectomorphism. A relative index may be defined between pairs of fixed points, and the differential counts the number of holomorphic cylinders with relative index 1.

The symplectic Floer homology of a Hamiltonian symplectomorphism of a compact manifold is isomorphic to the singular homology of the underlying manifold. Thus, the sum of the Betti numbers of that manifold yields the lower bound predicted by one version of the Arnold conjecture for the number of fixed points for a nondegenerate symplectomorphism. The SFH of a Hamiltonian symplectomorphism also has a pair of pants product that is a deformed cup product equivalent to quantum cohomology. A version of the product also exists for non-exact symplectomorphisms.

For the cotangent bundle of a manifold M, the Floer homology depends on the choice of Hamiltonian due to its noncompactness. For Hamiltonians that are quadratic at infinity, the Floer homology is the singular homology of the free loop space of M (proofs of various versions of this statement are due to Viterbo, Salamon–Weber, Abbondandolo–Schwarz, and Cohen). There are more complicated operations on the Floer homology of a cotangent bundle that correspond to the string topology operations on the homology of the loop space of the underlying manifold.

The symplectic version of Floer homology figures in a crucial way in the formulation of the homological mirror symmetry conjecture.

=== PSS isomorphism ===
In 1996 S. Piunikhin, D. Salamon and M. Schwarz summarized the results about the relation between Floer homology and quantum cohomology and formulated as the following:

- The Floer cohomology groups of the loop space of a semi-positive symplectic manifold (M,ω) are naturally isomorphic to the ordinary cohomology of M, tensored by a suitable Novikov ring associated the group of covering transformations.
- This isomorphism intertwines the quantum cup product structure on the cohomology of M with the pair-of-pants product on Floer homology.

The above condition of semi-positive and the compactness of symplectic manifold M is required for us to obtain Novikov ring and for the definition of both Floer homology and quantum cohomology. The semi-positive condition means that one of the following holds (note that the three cases are not disjoint):

- $\langle [\omega],A\rangle=\lambda\langle c_1,A\rangle$ for every A in π_{2}(M) where λ≥0 (M is monotone).
- $\langle c_1,A\rangle=0$ for every A in π_{2}(M).
- The minimal Chern Number N ≥ 0 defined by $\langle c_1,\pi_2(M)\rangle=N\mathbb{Z}$ is greater than or equal to n − 2.

The quantum cohomology group of symplectic manifold M can be defined as the tensor products of the ordinary cohomology with Novikov ring Λ, i.e.

$$QH_*(M)=H_*(M)\otimes\Lambda.$$

This construction of Floer homology explains the independence on the choice of the almost complex structure on M and the isomorphism to Floer homology provided from the ideas of Morse theory and pseudoholomorphic curves, where we must recognize the Poincaré duality between homology and cohomology as the background.

== Floer homology of three-manifolds ==
There are several equivalent Floer homologies associated to closed three-manifolds. Each yields three types of homology groups, which fit into an exact triangle. A knot in a three-manifold induces a filtration on the chain complex of each theory, whose chain homotopy type is a knot invariant. (Their homologies satisfy similar formal properties to the combinatorially defined Khovanov homology.)

These homologies are closely related to the Donaldson and Seiberg-Witten invariants of 4-manifolds, as well as to Taubes's Gromov invariant of symplectic 4-manifolds; the differentials of the corresponding three-manifold homologies to these theories are studied by considering solutions to the relevant differential equations (Yang–Mills, Seiberg–Witten, and Cauchy–Riemann, respectively) on the 3-manifold cross R. The 3-manifold Floer homologies should also be the targets of relative invariants for four-manifolds with boundary, related by gluing constructions to the invariants of a closed 4-manifold obtained by gluing together bounded 3-manifolds along their boundaries. (This is closely related to the notion of a topological quantum field theory.) For Heegaard Floer homology, the 3-manifold homology was defined first, and an invariant for closed 4-manifolds was later defined in terms of it.

There are also extensions of the 3-manifold homologies to 3-manifolds with boundary: sutured Floer homology (Juhász 2008) and bordered Floer homology (Lipshitz, Ozsváth & Thurston 2008). These are related to the invariants for closed 3-manifolds by gluing formulas for the Floer homology of a 3-manifold described as the union along the boundary of two 3-manifolds with boundary.

The three-manifold Floer homologies also come equipped with a distinguished element of the homology if the three-manifold is equipped with a contact structure. Kronheimer and Mrowka first introduced the contact element in the Seiberg–Witten case. Ozsvath and Szabo constructed it for Heegaard Floer homology using Giroux's relation between contact manifolds and open book decompositions, and it comes for free, as the homology class of the empty set, in embedded contact homology. (Which, unlike the other three, requires a contact structure for its definition. For embedded contact homology see Hutchings (2009).

These theories all come equipped with a priori relative gradings; these have been lifted to absolute gradings (by homotopy classes of oriented 2-plane fields) by Kronheimer and Mrowka (for SWF), Gripp and Huang (for HF), and Hutchings (for ECH). Cristofaro-Gardiner has shown that Taubes' isomorphism between ECH and Seiberg–Witten Floer cohomology preserves these absolute gradings.

=== Instanton Floer homology ===
This is a three-manifold invariant connected to Donaldson theory introduced by Floer himself. It is obtained using the Chern–Simons functional on the space of connections on a principal SU(2)-bundle over the three-manifold (more precisely, homology 3-spheres). Its critical points are flat connections and its flow lines are instantons, i.e. anti-self-dual connections on the three-manifold crossed with the real line. Instanton Floer homology may be viewed as a generalization of the Casson invariant because the Euler characteristic of the Floer homology agrees with the Casson invariant.

Soon after Floer's introduction of Floer homology, Donaldson realized that cobordisms induce maps. This was the first instance of the structure that came to be known as a topological quantum field theory.

=== Seiberg–Witten Floer homology ===
Seiberg–Witten Floer homology or monopole Floer homology is a homology theory for smooth 3-manifolds (equipped with a spin^{c} structure). It may be viewed as the Morse homology of the Chern–Simons–Dirac functional on U(1) connections on the three-manifold. The associated gradient flow equation corresponds to the Seiberg–Witten equations on the 3-manifold crossed with the real line. Equivalently, the generators of the chain complex are translation-invariant solutions to Seiberg–Witten equations (known as monopoles) on the product of a 3-manifold and the real line, and the differential counts solutions to the Seiberg–Witten equations on the product of a three-manifold and the real line, which are asymptotic to invariant solutions at infinity and negative infinity.

One version of Seiberg–Witten–Floer homology was constructed rigorously in the monograph Monopoles and Three-manifolds by Peter Kronheimer and Tomasz Mrowka, where it is known as monopole Floer homology. Taubes has shown that it is isomorphic to embedded contact homology. Alternate constructions of SWF for rational homology 3-spheres have been given by Manolescu (2003) and Frøyshov (2010); they are known to agree.

=== Heegaard Floer homology ===
Heegaard Floer homology // is an invariant due to Peter Ozsváth and Zoltán Szabó of a closed 3-manifold equipped with a spin^{c} structure. It is computed using a Heegaard diagram of the space via a construction analogous to Lagrangian Floer homology. Kutluhan, Lee & Taubes (2020) announced a proof that Heegaard Floer homology is isomorphic to Seiberg–Witten Floer homology, and Colin, Ghiggini & Honda (2011) announced a proof that the plus-version of Heegaard Floer homology (with reverse orientation) is isomorphic to embedded contact homology.

A knot in a three-manifold induces a filtration on the Heegaard Floer homology groups, and the filtered homotopy type is a powerful knot invariant, called knot Floer homology. It categorifies the Alexander polynomial. Knot Floer homology was defined by Ozsváth & Szabó (2004) and independently by Rasmussen (2003). It is known to detect knot genus. Using grid diagrams for the Heegaard splittings, knot Floer homology was given a combinatorial construction by Manolescu, Ozsváth & Sarkar (2009).

The Heegaard Floer homology of the double cover of S^3 branched over a knot is related by a spectral sequence to Khovanov homology (Ozsváth & Szabó 2005).

The "hat" version of Heegaard Floer homology was described combinatorially by Sarkar & Wang (2010). The "plus" and "minus" versions of Heegaard Floer homology, and the related Ozsváth–Szabó four-manifold invariants, can be described combinatorially as well (Manolescu, Ozsváth & Thurston 2009).

=== Embedded contact homology ===
Embedded contact homology, due to Michael Hutchings, is an invariant of 3-manifolds (with a distinguished second homology class, corresponding to the choice of a spin^{c} structure in Seiberg–Witten Floer homology) isomorphic (by work of Clifford Taubes) to Seiberg–Witten Floer cohomology and consequently (by work announced by Kutluhan, Lee & Taubes 2020 and Colin, Ghiggini & Honda 2011) to the plus-version of Heegaard Floer homology (with reverse orientation). It may be seen as an extension of Taubes's Gromov invariant, known to be equivalent to the Seiberg–Witten invariant, from closed symplectic 4-manifolds to certain non-compact symplectic 4-manifolds (namely, a contact three-manifold cross R). Its construction is analogous to symplectic field theory, in that it is generated by certain collections of closed Reeb orbits and its differential counts certain holomorphic curves with ends at certain collections of Reeb orbits. It differs from SFT in technical conditions on the collections of Reeb orbits that generate it—and in not counting all holomorphic curves with Fredholm index 1 with given ends, but only those that also satisfy a topological condition given by the ECH index, which in particular implies that the curves considered are (mainly) embedded.

The Weinstein conjecture that a contact 3-manifold has a closed Reeb orbit for any contact form holds on any manifold whose ECH is nontrivial, and was proved by Taubes using techniques closely related to ECH; extensions of this work yielded the isomorphism between ECH and SWF. Many constructions in ECH (including its well-definedness) rely upon this isomorphism (Taubes 2007).

The contact element of ECH has a particularly nice form: it is the cycle associated to the empty collection of Reeb orbits.

An analog of embedded contact homology may be defined for mapping tori of symplectomorphisms of a surface (possibly with boundary) and is known as periodic Floer homology, generalizing the symplectic Floer homology of surface symplectomorphisms. More generally, it may be defined with respect to any stable Hamiltonian structure on the 3-manifold; like contact structures, stable Hamiltonian structures define a nonvanishing vector field (the Reeb vector field), and Hutchings and Taubes have proven an analogue of the Weinstein conjecture for them, namely that they always have closed orbits (unless they are mapping tori of a 2-torus).

== Lagrangian intersection Floer homology ==
The Lagrangian Floer homology of two transversely intersecting Lagrangian submanifolds of a symplectic manifold is the homology of a chain complex generated by the intersection points of the two submanifolds and whose differential counts pseudoholomorphic Whitney discs.

Given three Lagrangian submanifolds L_{0}, L_{1}, and L_{2} of a symplectic manifold, there is a product structure on the Lagrangian Floer homology:

$$HF(L_0, L_1) \otimes HF(L_1,L_2) \rightarrow HF(L_0,L_2),$$

which is defined by counting holomorphic triangles (that is, holomorphic maps of a triangle whose vertices and edges map to the appropriate intersection points and Lagrangian submanifolds).

Papers on this subject are due to Fukaya, Oh, Ono, and Ohta; the recent work on "cluster homology" of Lalonde and Cornea offer a different approach to it. The Floer homology of a pair of Lagrangian submanifolds may not always exist; when it does, it provides an obstruction to isotoping one Lagrangian away from the other using a Hamiltonian isotopy.

Several kinds of Floer homology are special cases of Lagrangian Floer homology. The symplectic Floer homology of a symplectomorphism of M can be thought of as a case of Lagrangian Floer homology in which the ambient manifold is M crossed with M and the Lagrangian submanifolds are the diagonal and the graph of the symplectomorphism. The construction of Heegaard Floer homology is based on a variant of Lagrangian Floer homology for totally real submanifolds defined using a Heegaard splitting of a three-manifold. Seidel–Smith and Manolescu constructed a link invariant as a certain case of Lagrangian Floer homology, which conjecturally agrees with Khovanov homology, a combinatorially defined link invariant.

=== Atiyah–Floer conjecture ===
The Atiyah–Floer conjecture connects the instanton Floer homology with the Lagrangian intersection Floer homology. Consider a 3-manifold Y with a Heegaard splitting along a surface $\Sigma$. Then the space of flat connections on $\Sigma$ modulo gauge equivalence is a symplectic manifold $M(\Sigma)$ of dimension 6g − 6, where g is the genus of the surface $\Sigma$. In the Heegaard splitting, $\Sigma$ bounds two different 3-manifolds; the space of flat connections modulo gauge equivalence on each 3-manifold with boundary embeds into $M(\Sigma)$ as a Lagrangian submanifold. One can consider the Lagrangian intersection Floer homology. Alternately, we can consider the Instanton Floer homology of the 3-manifold Y. The Atiyah–Floer conjecture asserts that these two invariants are isomorphic.

=== Relations to mirror symmetry ===
The homological mirror symmetry conjecture of Maxim Kontsevich predicts an equality between the Lagrangian Floer homology of Lagrangians in a Calabi–Yau manifold $X$ and the Ext groups of coherent sheaves on the mirror Calabi–Yau manifold. In this situation, one should not focus on the Floer homology groups but on the Floer chain groups. Similar to the pair-of-pants product, one can construct multi-compositions using pseudo-holomorphic n-gons. These compositions satisfy the $A_\infty$-relations making the category of all (unobstructed) Lagrangian submanifolds in a symplectic manifold into an $A_\infty$-category, called the Fukaya category.

To be more precise, one must add additional data to the Lagrangian – a grading and a spin structure. A Lagrangian with a choice of these structures is often called a brane in homage to the underlying physics. The Homological Mirror Symmetry conjecture states there is a type of derived Morita equivalence between the Fukaya category of the Calabi–Yau $X$ and a dg category underlying the bounded derived category of coherent sheaves of the mirror, and vice versa.

== Symplectic field theory (SFT) ==
This is an invariant of contact manifolds and symplectic cobordisms between them, originally due to Yakov Eliashberg, Alexander Givental and Helmut Hofer. The symplectic field theory as well as its subcomplexes, rational symplectic field theory and contact homology, are defined as homologies of differential algebras, which are generated by closed orbits of the Reeb vector field of a chosen contact form. The differential counts certain holomorphic curves in the cylinder over the contact manifold, where the trivial examples are the branched coverings of (trivial) cylinders over closed Reeb orbits. It further includes a linear homology theory, called cylindrical or linearized contact homology (sometimes, by abuse of notation, just contact homology), whose chain groups are vector spaces generated by closed orbits and whose differentials count only holomorphic cylinders. However, cylindrical contact homology is not always defined due to the presence of holomorphic discs and a lack of regularity and transversality results. In situations where cylindrical contact homology makes sense, it may be seen as the (slightly modified) Morse homology of the action functional on the free loop space, which sends a loop to the integral of the contact form alpha over the loop. Reeb orbits are the critical points of this functional.

SFT also associates a relative invariant of a Legendrian submanifold of a contact manifold known as relative contact homology. Its generators are Reeb chords, which are trajectories of the Reeb vector field beginning and ending on a Lagrangian, and its differential counts certain holomorphic strips in the symplectization of the contact manifold whose ends are asymptotic to given Reeb chords.

In SFT the contact manifolds can be replaced by mapping tori of symplectic manifolds with symplectomorphisms. While the cylindrical contact homology is well-defined and given by the symplectic Floer homologies of powers of the symplectomorphism, (rational) symplectic field theory and contact homology can be considered as generalized symplectic Floer homologies. In the important case when the symplectomorphism is the time-one map of a time-dependent Hamiltonian, it was however shown that these higher invariants do not contain any further information.

== Floer homotopy ==
One conceivable way to construct a Floer homology theory of some object would be to construct a related spectrum whose ordinary homology is the desired Floer homology. Applying other homology theories to such a spectrum could yield other interesting invariants. This strategy was proposed by Ralph Cohen, John Jones, and Graeme Segal, and carried out in certain cases for Seiberg–Witten–Floer homology by Manolescu (2003) and for the symplectic Floer homology of cotangent bundles by Cohen. This approach was the basis of Manolescu's 2013 construction of Pin (2)-equivariant Seiberg–Witten Floer homology, with which he disproved the Triangulation Conjecture for manifolds of dimension 5 and higher.

== Analytic foundations ==
Many of these Floer homologies have not been completely and rigorously constructed, and many conjectural equivalences have not been proved. Technical difficulties come up in the analysis involved, especially in constructing compactified moduli spaces of pseudoholomorphic curves. Hofer, in collaboration with Kris Wysocki and Eduard Zehnder, has developed new analytic foundations via their theory of polyfolds and a "general Fredholm theory". While the polyfold project is not yet fully completed, in some important cases transversality was shown using simpler methods.

== Computation ==
Floer homologies are generally difficult to compute explicitly. For instance, the symplectic Floer homology for all surface symplectomorphisms was completed only in 2007. The Heegaard Floer homology has been a success story in this regard: researchers have exploited its algebraic structure to compute it for various classes of 3-manifolds and have found combinatorial algorithms for computation of much of the theory. It is also connected to existing invariants and structures and many insights into 3-manifold topology have resulted.
