= Whitney disk =

Topological mapping

In mathematics, given two submanifolds A and B of a manifold X intersecting in two points p and q, a Whitney disc is a mapping from the two-dimensional disc D, with two marked points, to X, such that the two marked points go to p and q, one boundary arc of D goes to A and the other to B.

Their existence and embeddedness is crucial in proving the h-cobordism theorem, where it is used to cancel the intersection points; and its failure in low dimensions corresponds to not being able to embed a Whitney disc. Casson handles are an important technical tool for constructing the embedded Whitney disc relevant to many results on topological four-manifolds.

Pseudoholomorphic Whitney discs are counted by the differential in Lagrangian intersection Floer homology.
