= Étienne-Louis Malus =

French officer, engineer, physicist and mathematician

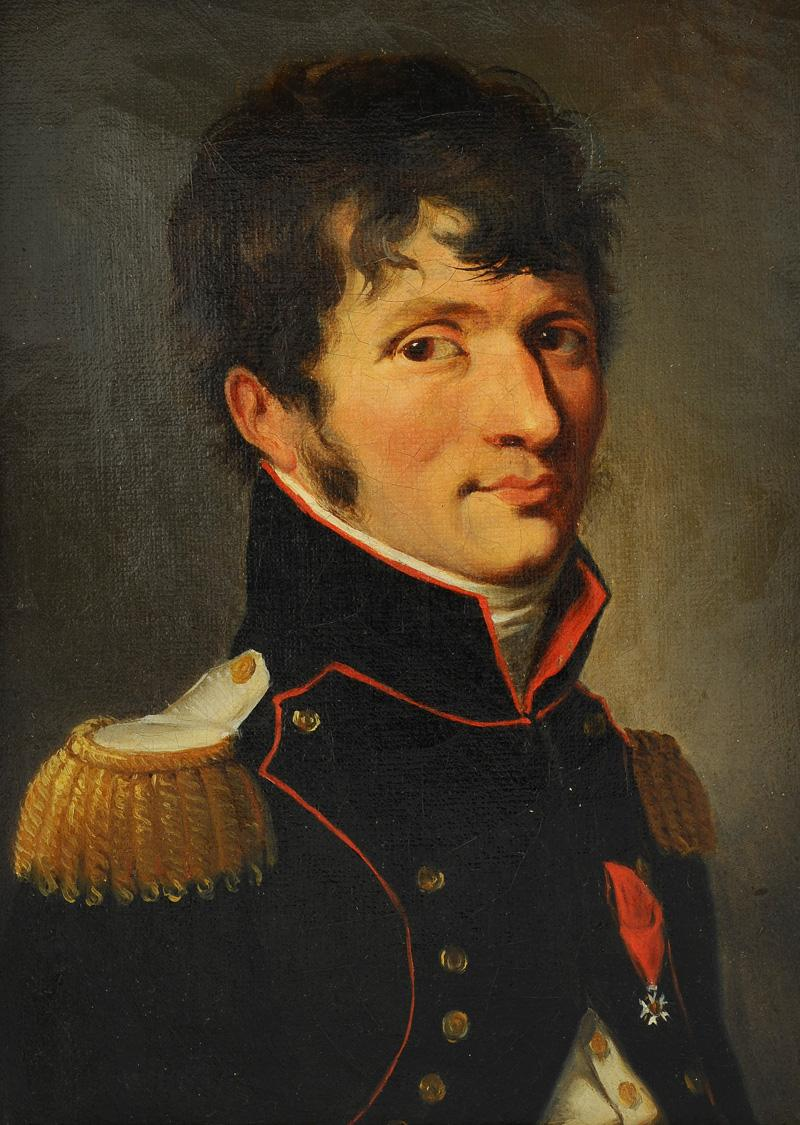
- Portrait by Louis-Léopold Boilly, 1810
- Born: 23 July 1775; Paris, France
- Died: 24 February 1812 (aged 36); Paris, France
- Known for: Malus's law Plane of polarization Polarization of light Malus-Dupin theorem
- Awards: Rumford Medal (1810)
- Scientific career
- Fields: Physics

Étienne-Louis Malus (/ˈɛt.i.ɛn ˈluː.i məˈluːs/; French: [e.tjɛn.lwi ma.lys]; 23 July 1775 – 23 February 1812) was a French officer, engineer, physicist, and mathematician.

Malus was born in Paris, France and studied at the military engineering school at Mezires where he was taught by Gaspard Monge. He participated in Napoleon's expedition into Egypt (1798 to 1801). He was also a member of the mathematics section of the Institut d'Égypte. Malus became a member of the Académie des Sciences in 1810. In 1810 the Royal Society of London awarded him the Rumford Medal.

His mathematical work was almost entirely concerned with the study of light. He studied geometric systems called ray systems, closely connected to Julius Plücker's line geometry. He conducted experiments to verify Christiaan Huygens's theories of light and rewrote the theory in analytical form. His discovery of the polarization of light by reflection was published in 1809 and his theory of double refraction of light in crystals, in 1810.

Malus attempted to identify the relationship between the polarising angle of reflection that he had discovered, and the refractive index of the reflecting material. While he deduced the correct relation for water, he was unable to do so for glasses due to the low quality of materials available to him (the refractive index of most glasses available at that time varied between the surface and the interior of the glass). It was not until 1815 that Sir David Brewster was able to experiment with higher quality glasses and correctly formulate what is known as Brewster's law. This law was later explained theoretically by Augustin Fresnel, as a special case of his Fresnel equations.

Malus is probably best remembered for Malus's law, giving the resultant intensity, when a polariser is placed in the path of an incident beam. A follower of Laplace, both his statement of the Malus's law and his earlier works on polarisation and birefringence were formulated using the corpuscular theory of light.

His name is one of the 72 names inscribed on the Eiffel tower.

He had been in poor health for several years, partly due to illnesses contracted during Napoleon’s Egyptian campaign. By 1812, his tuberculosis had advanced, and he died in Paris at age 36.

== "Discovery" of polarization ==
In 1810, Malus, while engaged on the theory of double refraction, casually examined through a doubly refracting prism of quartz the sunlight reflected from the windows of the Luxembourg palace. He was surprised to find that the two rays alternately disappeared as the prism was rotated through successive right angles, in other words, that the reflected light had acquired properties exactly corresponding to those of the rays transmitted through Iceland spar.

He named this phenomenon polarization, and thought it could not be explained by wave theory of light. Instead, he explained it by stating that light-corpuscules have polarity (like magnetic poles).

== Selected works ==
- Mémoire sur la mesure du pouvoir réfringent des corps opaques. in Nouveau bulletin des sciences de la Société philomathique de Paris, 1 (1807), 77–81
- Mémoire sur de nouveaux phénomènes d’optique. ibid., 2 (1811), 291–295
- Traité d’optique. in Mémoires présentés à l’Institut des sciences par divers savants, 2 (1811), 214–302
- Théorie de la double réfraction de la lumière dans les substances cristallines. ibid., 303–508

== Work ==
Malus mathematically analyzed the properties of a system of continuous light rays in three dimensions. He found the equation of caustic surfaces and the Malus theorem: Rays of light that are emitted from a point source, after which they have been reflected on a surface, are all normal to a common surface, but after the second refraction they no longer have this property. If the perpendicular surface is identified with a wave front, it is obvious that this result is false, which Malus did not realize because he adhered to Newton's theory of light emission. Malus's theorem was not proved until 1824 by W. R. Hamilton, with Adolphe Quetelet and Joseph Diez Gergonne giving a separate proof in 1825.

== See also ==
- Polarimeter
- Total internal reflection
