= Shigeo Sasaki =

Japanese mathematician

Shigeo Sasaki (佐々木 重夫) (18 November 1912 Yamagata Prefecture, Japan – 14 August 1987 Tokyo) was a Japanese mathematician working on differential geometry who introduced Sasaki manifolds. He retired from Tohoku University's Mathematical Institute in April 1976.

== Publications ==
- Sasaki, Shigeo (1985), Tachibana, Shun-ichi (ed.), Selected papers, Tokyo: Kinokuniya Company Ltd., MR 0834384
