= Open book decomposition =

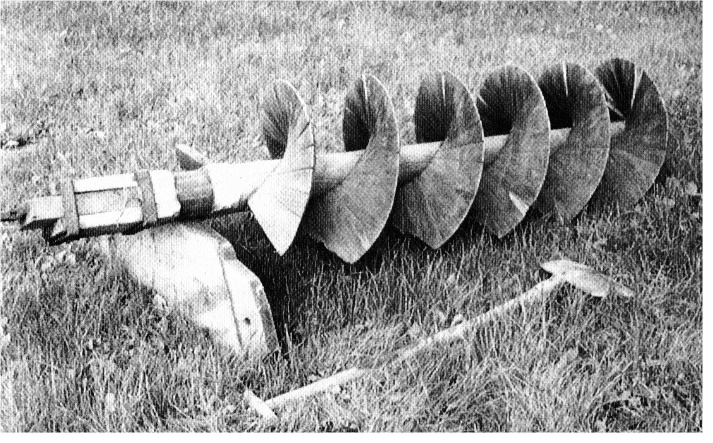
An example open book structure in the 3-sphere. The binding is a single solid torus unlink. A single leaf is shown as a helix around the single solid torus.

In mathematics, an open book decomposition (or simply an open book) is a decomposition of a closed oriented 3-manifold M into a union of surfaces (necessarily with boundary) and solid tori. Open books have relevance to contact geometry, with a famous theorem of Emmanuel Giroux (given below) that shows that contact geometry can be studied from an entirely topological viewpoint.

== Definition and construction ==
Definition. An open book decomposition of a 3-dimensional manifold M is a pair (B, π) where

- B is an oriented link in M, called the binding of the open book;
- π: M \ B → S^{1} is a fibration of the complement of B such that for each θ ∈ S^{1}, π^{−1}(θ) is the interior of a compact surface Σ ⊂ M whose boundary is B. The surface Σ is called the page of the open book.

This is the special case m = 3 of an open book decomposition of an m-dimensional manifold, for any m.

The definition for general m is similar, except that the surface with boundary (Σ, B) is replaced by an (m − 1)-manifold with boundary (P, ∂P). Equivalently, the open book decomposition can be thought of as a homeomorphism of M to the quotient space
$$P \times [0,1]/(x,t) \sim (x,s)\text{ for }x \in \partial P\text{ and }(x,0) \sim (f(x),1)\text{ for }x \in P$$
where f:P → P is a self-homeomorphism preserving the boundary. This quotient space is called a relative mapping torus.

When Σ is an oriented compact surface with n boundary components and φ: Σ → Σ is a homeomorphism which is the identity near the boundary, we can construct an open book by first forming the mapping torus Σ_{φ}. Since φ is the identity on ∂Σ, ∂Σ_{φ} is the trivial circle bundle over a union of circles, that is, a union of tori; one torus for each boundary component. To complete the construction, solid tori are glued to fill in the boundary tori so that each circle S^{1} × {p} ⊂ S^{1}×∂D^{2} is identified with the boundary of a page. In this case, the binding is the collection of n cores S^{1}×{q} of the n solid tori glued into the mapping torus, for arbitrarily chosen q ∈ D^{2}. It is known that any open book can be constructed this way. As the only information used in the construction is the surface and the homeomorphism, an alternate definition of open book is simply the pair (Σ, φ) with the construction understood. In short, an open book is a mapping torus with solid tori glued in so that the core circle of each torus runs parallel to the boundary of the fiber.

Each torus in ∂Σ_{φ} is fibered by circles parallel to the binding, each circle a boundary component of a page. One envisions a rolodex-looking structure for a neighborhood of the binding (that is, the solid torus glued to ∂Σ_{φ})—the pages of the rolodex connect to pages of the open book and the center of the rolodex is the binding. Thus the term open book.

It is a 1972 theorem of Elmar Winkelnkemper that for m > 6, a simply-connected m-dimensional manifold has an open book decomposition if and only if it has signature 0. In 1977 Terry Lawson proved that for odd m > 6, every m-dimensional manifold has an open book decomposition, a result extended to 5-manifolds and manifolds with boundary by Frank Quinn in 1979. Quinn also showed that for even m > 6, an m-dimensional manifold has an open book decomposition if and only if an asymmetric Witt group obstruction is 0.

== Giroux correspondence ==
In 2002, Emmanuel Giroux published the following result:

Theorem. Let M be a compact oriented 3-manifold. Then there is a bijection between the set of oriented contact structures on M up to isotopy and the set of open book decompositions of M up to positive stabilization.

Positive stabilization consists of modifying the page by adding a 2-dimensional 1-handle and modifying the monodromy by adding a positive Dehn twist along a curve that runs over that handle exactly once. Implicit in this theorem is that the new open book defines the same contact 3-manifold. Giroux's result has led to some breakthroughs in what is becoming more commonly called contact topology, such as the classification of contact structures on certain classes of 3-manifolds. Roughly speaking, a contact structure corresponds to an open book if, away from the binding, the contact distribution is isotopic to the tangent spaces of the pages through confoliations. One imagines smoothing the contact planes (preserving the contact condition almost everywhere) to lie tangent to the pages.
