= Reeb vector field =

Mathematical concept

In mathematics, the Reeb vector field, named after the French mathematician Georges Reeb, is a notion that appears in various domains of contact geometry including:

- in a contact manifold, given a contact 1-form $\alpha$, the Reeb vector field satisfies $R \in \mathrm{ker }\ d\alpha, \ \alpha (R) = 1$,
- in particular, in the context of Sasakian manifold.

If a contact manifold arises as a constant-energy hypersurface inside a symplectic manifold, then the Reeb vector field is the restriction to the submanifold of the Hamiltonian vector field associated to the energy function. (The restriction yields a vector field on the contact hypersurface because the Hamiltonian vector field preserves energy levels.)

The dynamics of the Reeb field can be used to study the structure of the contact manifold or even the underlying manifold using techniques of Floer homology such as symplectic field theory and, in three dimensions, embedded contact homology. Different contact forms whose kernels give the same contact structure will yield different Reeb vector fields, whose dynamics are in general very different. The various flavors of contact homology depend a priori on the choice of a contact form, and construct algebraic structures the closed trajectories of their Reeb vector fields; however, these algebraic structures turn out to be independent of the contact form, i.e. they are invariants of the underlying contact structure, so that in the end, the contact form may be seen as an auxiliary choice. In the case of embedded contact homology, one obtains an invariant of the underlying three-manifold, i.e. the embedded contact homology is independent of contact structure; this allows one to obtain results that hold for any Reeb vector field on the manifold.

== Definition ==
Let $\xi$ be a contact vector field on a manifold $M$ of dimension $2n+1$. Let $\xi = Ker \; \alpha$ for a 1-form $\alpha$ on $M$ such that $\alpha \wedge (d \alpha)^n \neq 0$. Given a contact form $\alpha$, there exists a unique field (the Reeb vector field) $X_\alpha$ on $M$ such that:

- $i(X_\alpha)d \alpha = 0$
- $i(X_\alpha) \alpha = 1$

== Examples ==
The standard contact structure on $\R^3$.

The standard contact structure on $\R^3$ is $\alpha = dz - ydx$, with Reeb vector field $R = \partial_z$.

== See also ==
- Weinstein conjecture
