= Legendrian knot =

Knot theory

The standard contact structure on R^{3}. Each point in R^{3} has a plane associated to it by the contact structure, in this case as the kernel of the one-form dz − y dx.

In mathematics, a Legendrian knot often refers to a smooth embedding of the circle into $\mathbb R^3$, which is tangent to the standard contact structure on $\mathbb R^3$. It is the lowest-dimensional case of a Legendrian submanifold, which is an embedding of a k-dimensional manifold into a (2k+1)-dimensional contact manifold that is always tangent to the contact hyperplane.

== Classification ==
Two smooth knots are equivalent if there is a way to smoothly deform one into the other. That is, if there is a smooth ambient isotopy from one to the other.

Similarly, two Legendrian knots are equivalent if there is a way to smoothly deform one into the other, such that any intermediate knot is still a Legendrian knot. Two equivalent Legendrian knots are equivalent as smooth knots, but the converse is false.

Many inequivalent Legendrian knots can be distinguished by considering their Thurston-Bennequin invariants and rotation number, which are together known as the "classical invariants" of Legendrian knots. More sophisticated invariants have been constructed, including one constructed combinatorially by Chekanov and using holomorphic discs by Eliashberg. This Chekanov-Eliashberg invariant yields an invariant for loops of Legendrian knots by considering the monodromy of the loops. This has yielded noncontractible loops of Legendrian knots which are contractible in the space of all knots.

Any Legendrian knot may be $C^0$ perturbed to a transverse knot (a knot transverse to a contact structure) by pushing off in a direction transverse to the contact planes. The set of isomorphism classes of Legendrian knots modulo negative Legendrian stabilizations is in bijection with the set of transverse knots.
