= Thurston–Bennequin number =

Mathematical theory of knots

In the mathematical theory of knots, the Thurston–Bennequin number, or Bennequin number, is an invariant associated with a Legendrian knot in a three dimensional contact manifold. It is named after William Thurston and Daniel Bennequin. The Thurston-Bennequin number measures the "twisting of the contact structure around the knot". Together with the rotation number, they are often referred as the "classical" invariants of Legendrian knots.

The Thurston-Bennequin number of a Legendrian knot $K$ is usually denoted by $\mathrm{tb}(K)$. The maximal Thurston–Bennequin number, $\overline{\mathrm{tb}}(K)$, over all Legendrian representatives of a knot in $\mathbb R^3$ is a topological knot invariant.

== Definition and properties ==
Let $K$ be a null-homologous oriented Legendrian knot in a co-oriented three-dimensional contact manifold $(M^3,\xi)$ and fix a Seifert surface $\Sigma$ to $K$, that is an embedded connected, compact, orientable surface with boundary $\partial \Sigma = K$. The Thurston-Bennequin number of $K$ relative to $\Sigma$ is the defined as the signed intersection number of the contact plane field $\xi$ with $\Sigma$.

Let $K'$ be a small push-off of $K$ obtained by pushing along a vector field $v$ transverse to $\xi$. The Thurston-Bennequin number can also be defined as $\mathrm{lk}(K,K')$, where $\mathrm{lk}$ denotes the linking number.

=== The Euclidean case ===
We consider the case where $(M,\xi)=(\mathbb{R}^3,\xi_{\mathrm{std}})$ is the standard contact structure on $\mathbb{R}^3$. If we denote $(x,y,z)$ the coordinates in $\mathbb{R}^3$, the contact structure $\xi_{\mathrm{std}}$ is the kernel of the one-form $dz-ydx$. The applications $\Pi \colon \mathbb{R}^3 \to \mathbb{R}^2, (x,y,z) \mapsto (x,z)$ and $\pi_L \colon \mathbb{R}^3 \to \mathbb{R}^2, (x,y,z) \mapsto (x,y)$ denote respectively the front projection and the Lagrangian projection. The Thurston-Bennequin number can be computed easily from its front and Lagrangian projections.

==== Lagrangian projection description ====
The Thurston-Bennequin number of a Legendrian knot $K \subset \mathbb R^3$ is the writhe of its Lagrangian projection $\pi_L(K)$.

==== Front projection description ====
For a Legendrian knot $K \subset \mathbb{R}^3$, its front projection $\Pi(K)\subset \mathbb R^2$ is called its front diagram. The front diagram of a Legendrian knot does not have vertical tangencies, however cusps can appear. Generically, the front diagram of a knot as no tangency point, no triple intersection and standard cusp singularities. In this case the Thurston-Bennequin number is

$$\mathrm{tb}(K)=\textrm{writhe}(\Pi(K))-\dfrac{1}{2}\big(\# \text{number of cusps}\big),$$

where $\textrm{writhe}(\Pi(K))$ denotes the writhe of the front diagram.

The invariant can also be computed using a grid diagram corresponding to a particular Legendrian representative of a knot. In this setting, the number can be computed as the writhe of the diagram minus the number of 'northwest' corners.

A grid diagram of the knot $8_{20}$ and an associated Legendrian representative of it.

By smoothing the 'northeast' and 'southwest' corners and rotating the diagram and switching all crossings, one can convert a grid diagram into the associated Legendrian knot.

== The Bennequin inequality ==
In his thesis, Daniel Bennequin proved an inequality involving the Thurston-Bennequin number. He proved that for all Legendrian knot $K$ in the standard contact $\mathbb R^3$ the following inequality is true:

$$\mathrm{tb}(K)+\vert \textrm{rot}(K) \vert \leq - \chi(\Sigma),$$

where $\chi(\Sigma)$ denotes the Euler characteristic of a Seifert surface $\Sigma$ of $K$ and $\textrm{rot}(K)$ denotes the rotation number of $K$.

In particular, the maximal Thurston-Bennequin number gives a lower bound on the genus of a topological knot.
