= Sasakian manifold =

In differential geometry, a Sasakian manifold (named after Shigeo Sasaki) is a contact manifold $(M,\theta)$ equipped with a special kind of Riemannian metric $g$, called a Sasakian metric. They are studied as a natural odd-dimensional counterpart of Kähler manifolds (which are necessarily even-dimensional).

== Definition ==
A Sasakian metric is defined using the construction of the Riemannian cone. Given a Riemannian manifold $(M,g)$, its Riemannian cone is the product

$$(M\times {\R}^{>0})\,$$

of $M$ with a half-line ${\R}^{>0}$, equipped with the cone metric

$$t^2 g + dt^2,\,$$

where $t$ is the parameter in ${\R}^{>0}$.

A manifold $M$ equipped with a 1-form $\theta$ is contact if and only if the 2-form

$$d(t^2\theta)=t^2\,d\theta + 2t\, dt \wedge \theta\,$$

on its cone is symplectic (this is one of the possible definitions of a contact structure). A contact Riemannian manifold is Sasakian, if its Riemannian cone with the cone metric is a Kähler manifold with Kähler form

$$t^2\,d\theta + 2t\,dt \wedge \theta.$$

== Examples ==
As an example consider

$$S^{2n-1}\hookrightarrow {\R}^{2n}={\C}^{n}$$

where the right hand side is a natural Kähler manifold and read as the cone over the sphere (endowed with embedded metric). The contact 1-form on $S^{2n-1}$ is the form associated to the tangent vector $i\vec{N}$, constructed from the unit-normal vector $\vec{N}$ to the sphere ($i$ being the complex structure on ${\C}^n$).

Another non-compact example is ${{\R}^{2n+1}}$ with coordinates $(\vec{x},\vec{y},z)$ endowed with contact-form

$\theta=\frac12 dz+\sum_i y_i\,dx_i$

and the Riemannian metric

$g=\sum_i (dx_i)^2+(dy_i)^2+\theta^2.$

As a third example consider:

${\mathbb P}^{2n-1}{\mathbb R}\hookrightarrow {\C}^{n}/{\Z}_2$

where the right hand side has a natural Kähler structure, and the group ${\Z}_2$ acts by reflection at the origin.

== History ==
Sasakian manifolds were introduced in 1960 by the Japanese geometer Shigeo Sasaki. There was not much activity in this field after the mid-1970s, until the advent of String theory. Since then Sasakian manifolds have gained prominence in physics and algebraic geometry, mostly due to a string of papers by Charles P. Boyer and Krzysztof Galicki and their co-authors.

== The Reeb vector field ==
The homothetic vector field on the cone over a Sasakian manifold is defined to be

$$t\partial/\partial t.$$

As the cone is by definition Kähler, there exists a complex structure J. The Reeb vector field on the Sasaskian manifold is defined to be

$$\xi =-J(t\partial/\partial t).$$

It is nowhere vanishing. It commutes with all holomorphic Killing vectors on the cone and in particular with all isometries of the Sasakian manifold. If the orbits of the vector field close then the space of orbits is a Kähler orbifold. The Reeb vector field at the Sasakian manifold at unit radius is a unit vector field and tangential to the embedding.

== Sasaki–Einstein manifolds ==
A Sasakian manifold $M$ is a manifold whose Riemannian cone is Kähler. If, in addition, this cone is Ricci-flat, $M$ is called Sasaki–Einstein; if it is hyperkähler, $M$ is called 3-Sasakian. Any 3-Sasakian manifold is both an Einstein manifold and a spin manifold.

If M is positive-scalar-curvature Kähler–Einstein manifold, then, by an observation of Shoshichi Kobayashi, the circle bundle S in its canonical line bundle admits a Sasaki–Einstein metric, in a manner that makes the projection from S to M into a Riemannian submersion. (For example, it follows that there exist Sasaki–Einstein metrics on suitable circle bundles over the 3rd through 8th del Pezzo surfaces.) While this Riemannian submersion construction provides a correct local picture of any Sasaki–Einstein manifold, the global structure of such manifolds can be more complicated. For example, one can more generally construct Sasaki–Einstein manifolds by starting from a Kähler–Einstein orbifold M. Using this observation, Boyer, Galicki, and János Kollár constructed infinitely many homeotypes of Sasaki-Einstein 5-manifolds. The same construction shows that the moduli space of Einstein metrics on the 5-sphere has at least several hundred connected components.
