= Casson handle =

In 4-dimensional topology, a branch of mathematics, a Casson handle is a 4-dimensional topological 2-handle constructed by an infinite procedure. They are named for Andrew Casson, who introduced them in about 1973. They were originally called "flexible handles" by Casson himself, and Michael Freedman (1982) introduced the name "Casson handle" by which they are known today. In that work he showed that Casson handles are topological 2-handles, and used this to classify simply connected compact topological 4-manifolds.

== Motivation ==
In the proof of the h-cobordism theorem, the following construction is used. Given a circle in the boundary of a manifold, we would often like to find a disk embedded in the manifold whose boundary is the given circle. If the manifold is simply connected then we can find a map from a disc to the manifold with boundary the given circle, and if the manifold is of dimension at least 5 then by putting this disc in "general position" it becomes an embedding. The number 5 appears for the following reason: submanifolds of dimension m and n in general position do not intersect provided the dimension of the manifold containing them has dimension greater than $m+n$. In particular, a disc (of dimension 2) in general position will have no self intersections inside a manifold of dimension greater than 2+2.

If the manifold is 4 dimensional, this does not work: the problem is that a disc in general position may have double points where two points of the disc have the same image. This is the main reason why the usual proof of the h-cobordism theorem only works for cobordisms whose boundary has dimension at least 5. We can try to get rid of these double points as follows. Draw a line on the disc joining two points with the same image. If the image of this line is the boundary of an embedded disc (called a Whitney disc), then it is easy to remove the double point. However this argument seems to be going round in circles: in order to eliminate a double point of the first disc, we need to construct a second embedded disc, whose construction involves exactly the same problem of eliminating double points.

Casson's idea was to iterate this construction an infinite number of times, in the hope that the problems about double points will somehow disappear in the infinite limit.

== Construction ==
A Casson handle has a 2-dimensional skeleton, which can be constructed as follows.

1. Start with a 2-disc $D^2$.
2. Identify a finite number of pairs of points in the disc.
3. For each pair of identified points, choose a path in the disc joining these points, and construct a new disc with boundary this path. (So we add a disc for each pair of identified points.)
4. Repeat steps 2–3 on each new disc.

We can represent these skeletons by rooted trees such that each point is joined to only a finite number of other points: the tree has a point for each disc, and a line joining points if the corresponding discs intersect in the skeleton.

A Casson handle is constructed by "thickening" the 2-dimensional construction above to give a 4-dimensional object: we replace each disc $D^2$ by a copy of $D^2\times \R^2$. Informally we can think of this as taking a small neighborhood of the skeleton (thought of as embedded in some 4-manifold). There are some minor extra subtleties in doing this: we need to keep track of some framings, and intersection points now have an orientation.

Casson handles correspond to rooted trees as above, except that now each vertex has a sign attached to it to indicate the orientation of the double point. We may as well assume that the tree has no finite branches, as finite branches can be "unravelled" so make no difference.

The simplest exotic Casson handle corresponds to the tree which is just a half infinite line of points (with all signs the same). It is diffeomorphic to $D^2\times D^2$ with a cone over the Whitehead continuum removed. There is a similar description of more complicated Casson handles, with the Whitehead continuum replaced by a similar but more complicated set.

== Structure ==
Freedman's main theorem about Casson handles states that they are all homeomorphic to $D^2\times \R^2$; or in other words they are topological 2-handles. In general they are not diffeomorphic to $D^2\times \R^2$ as follows from Donaldson's theorem, and there are an uncountable infinite number of different diffeomorphism types of Casson handles. However the interior of a Casson handle is diffeomorphic to $\R^4$; Casson handles differ from standard 2 handles only in the way the boundary is attached to the interior.

Freedman's structure theorem can be used to prove the h-cobordism theorem for 5-dimensional topological cobordisms, which in turn implies the 4-dimensional topological Poincaré conjecture.
