= Symplectization =

In mathematics, the symplectization (or symplectification) of a contact manifold is a symplectic manifold which naturally corresponds to it.

== Definition ==
Let $(V,\xi)$ be a contact manifold, and let $x \in V$. Consider the set

$$S_xV = \{\beta \in T^*_xV - \{ 0 \} \mid \ker \beta = \xi_x\} \subset T^*_xV$$

of all nonzero 1-forms at $x$, which have the contact plane $\xi_x$ as their kernel. The union

$$SV = \bigcup_{x \in V}S_xV \subset T^*V$$

is a symplectic submanifold of the cotangent bundle of $V$, and thus possesses a natural symplectic structure.

The projection $\pi : SV \to V$ supplies the symplectization with the structure of a principal bundle over $V$ with structure group $\R^* \equiv \R - \{0\}$.

== The coorientable case ==
When the contact structure $\xi$ is cooriented by means of a contact form $\alpha$, there is another version of symplectization, in which only forms giving the same coorientation to $\xi$ as $\alpha$ are considered:

$$S^+_xV = \{\beta \in T^*_xV - \{0\} \,|\, \beta = \lambda\alpha,\,\lambda > 0\} \subset T^*_xV,$$

$$S^+V = \bigcup_{x \in V}S^+_xV \subset T^*V.$$

Note that $\xi$ is coorientable if and only if the bundle $\pi : SV \to V$ is trivial. Any section of this bundle is a coorienting form for the contact structure.
