= Contact geometry =

Branch of geometry

In mathematics, contact geometry is the study of a geometric structure on smooth manifolds given by a hyperplane distribution in the tangent bundle satisfying a condition called 'complete non-integrability'. Equivalently, such a distribution may be given (at least locally) as the kernel of a differential one-form, and the non-integrability condition translates into a maximal non-degeneracy condition on the form. These conditions are opposite to two equivalent conditions for 'complete integrability' of a hyperplane distribution, i.e. that it be tangent to a codimension one foliation on the manifold, whose equivalence is the content of the Frobenius theorem.

Contact geometry is in many ways an odd-dimensional counterpart of symplectic geometry, a structure on certain even-dimensional manifolds. Both contact and symplectic geometry are motivated by the mathematical formalism of classical mechanics, where one can consider either the even-dimensional phase space of a mechanical system or constant-energy hypersurface, which, being codimension one, has odd dimension.

== Mathematical formulation ==
=== Contact structure ===
Given an $n$-dimensional smooth manifold $M$, and a point $p \in M$, a contact element of $M$ with contact point $p$ is an $n-1$-dimensional linear subspace of the tangent space to $M$ at $p$. A contact structure on an odd dimensional manifold $M$, of dimension $2n+1$, is a smooth distribution of contact elements, denoted by $\xi$, which is generic (in the sense of being maximally non-integrable) at each point. A contact manifold is a smooth manifold equipped with a contact structure.

Due to the ambiguity by multiplication with a nonzero smooth function, the space of all contact elements of $M$ can be identified with a quotient of the cotangent bundle $T^*M$ (with the zero section $0_M$ removed), namely:
$$\mathrm{PT}^*M = (T^*M \setminus 0_M)/{\sim}$$
for $\omega_i \in T^*_pM$, $\omega_1 \sim \omega_2 \iff \exists\, \lambda \neq 0$ with $\omega_1 = \lambda \omega_2$.

Equivalently, a contact structure can be defined as a completely non-integrable section of $C_{2n} M$, the $2n$-th contact bundle of $M$.

By Darboux's theorem, all contact structures of the same dimension are locally diffeomorphic. Thus, unlike the case of Riemannian geometry, but like symplectic geometry, the local theory of contact geometry is trivial, and there are no analogs of angle or curvature. However, the global theory is nontrivial, and there are globally inequivalent contact structures.

=== Contact form ===
Unlike a vector field or a covector field (i.e. a 1-form), a contact structure does not have an intrinsic sense of size or coorientation. In this sense, it can be interpreted as the space of unparameterized infinitesimal surfaces, much like how a tangent bundle can be interpreted as the space of time-parameterized infinitesimal curves.

A contact form is a 1-form $\alpha$ that provides an intrinsic sense of size and coorientation. i.e. a smooth section of the cotangent bundle. The non-integrability condition can be given explicitly in exterior calculus:

$$\alpha \wedge (\text{d}\alpha)^n \neq 0 \ \text{where} \ (\text{d}\alpha)^n = \underbrace {\text{d}\alpha \wedge \ldots  \wedge \text{d}\alpha}_{n\text{-times}}.$$

Note that given any $f$ non-zero smooth function, $f\alpha$ gives the same contact structure. In order to absorb the ambiguity of magnitude, one can consider the set of all $f\alpha$ for an arbitrary smooth $f: M \to \R$. This makes up an ideal of all 1-forms on $M$, called the contact ideal.

By Darboux's theorem, around any point there is a neighborhood with a coordinate system $(z, x_1, \dots, x_n, y_1, \dots, y_n)$, such that $\alpha = d z - \Sigma_{i=1}^n y_i dx_i$. Such coordinates are called Darboux coordinates. In this sense, contact geometry is a stable distribution, since they are all the same up to local diffeomorphism.

$\alpha$ does not need to be globally defined. Indeed sometimes it cannot be globally defined due to topological obstructions. One obstruction is that if $\alpha$ is globally defined, then $\alpha \wedge (\text{d}\alpha)^n$ is a volume form, thus $M$ is orientable. Thus if $M$ is not orientable, then $\alpha$ cannot be globally defined. Another obstruction is coorientability.

=== Coorientation ===
A contact structure is coorientable iff there exists a global choice of the "positive" side of each contact element. That is, the contact form $\alpha$ can be defined globally as a nonvanishing section in the cotangent bundle $T^* M$. In this case, $\alpha$ is uniquely defined, up to a multiplication by a nonzero smooth function. A coorientation can be defined as a global nonzero section of the line bundle $T M/ \ker \alpha$.

The contact structure is coorientable iff $T M/ \ker \alpha \cong M \times \R$ is trivial, iff the cohomology is trivial, and more specifically iff the first Stiefel–Whitney class is trivial.

=== Non-integrability ===
A completely integrable distribution on $\R^3$

Because $\alpha \wedge (\text{d}\alpha)^n \neq 0$, the Frobenius theorem on integrability implies that the contact field $\xi$ is completely nonintegrable. Indeed contact structures are defined as completely nonintegrable distributions. You cannot find a hypersurface in $M$ whose tangent spaces agree with $\xi$, even locally. In fact, there is no submanifold of dimension greater than $n$ whose tangent spaces lie in $\xi$. A submanifold that achieves this limit of dimension $n$ is a Legendrian submanifold.

For 3-manifolds, there is a geometric characterization of contact structures on it. A distribution $\mathcal D$ of plane elements in a 3-manifold is a contact structure if and only if on any point $p$ on any embedded surface $\Sigma$, the contact at $p$ between $\Sigma$ and $\mathcal D$ is at most order 1.

Maximal non-integrability, as defined by $\alpha \wedge (\text{d}\alpha)^n \neq 0$, can be thought of as a generic property of distributions, since $\alpha \wedge (\text{d}\alpha)^n \neq 0$ is a non-generic algebraic equation on the derivatives of the components of $\alpha$. This perspective explains why it is a stable distribution.

Another perspective on non-integrability is through the Chow–Rashevskii connectivity theorem, which states that any two points in a contact manifold can be connected by a smooth curve tangent to the contact structure. This has been generalized to sub-Riemannian manifolds using the language of theoretical thermodynamics, especially Carnot cycles.

Another perspective is via the Lie algebra of the distribution. There exists up to $n$ vector fields $v_1, \dots, v_n$ in the distribution such that they do not generate .

== Examples ==
=== The standard contact structure ===
The standard contact structure on R^{3}, of the one-form dz − y dx.

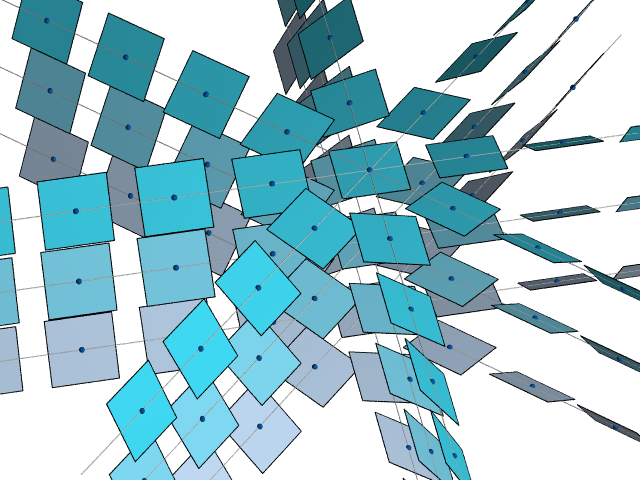
The standard contact structure is isomorphic to the cylindrically symmetric $dz - r^2 d\theta$.

The standard contact structure in $\R^3$, with coordinates (x,y,z), is the one-form dz − y dx. The contact plane ξ at a point (x,y,z) is spanned by the vectors X_{1} = ∂_{y} and X_{2} = ∂_{x} + y ∂_{z}.

These planes appear to twist along the y-axis. It is not integrable, as can be verified by drawing an infinitesimal square in the x-y plane, and follow the path along the one-forms. The path would not return to the same z-coordinate after one circuit. This is an instance of the Chow–Rashevskii connectivity theorem.

This example generalizes to any $\R^{2n+1}$. Its standard contact structure is $\theta := dz - \Sigma_{i=1}^n y_i dx_i$. It is standard, because Darboux's theorem states that any contact structure is locally the same as the standard one.

=== The standard contact structure on the sphere ===
Given any n, the standard contact form on the (2n-1)-sphere $\mathbb S^{2n-1}$is obtained by restricting the Liouville 1-form $\lambda = \Sigma_i\left(x_i d y_i -y_i d x_i\right)$ on $\R^{2n}$ to the unit sphere. Equivalently, it is obtained by the Liouville 1-form on $\mathbb C^n$ $\Sigma_j z_j d \bar{z}_j-\bar{z}_j d z_j = dr \circ J$, where $J$ is the multiplication by $i$, i.e. the standard complex structure on $\mathbb C^n$.

The Reeb vector field is $\Sigma_{j=1}^n\left(x_j \partial_{y_j}+y_j \partial_{x_j}\right)=\Sigma_{j=1}^n\left(z_j \partial_{z_j}+\bar{z}_j \partial_{\bar{z}_j}\right)$, which generates the Hopf fibration.

Equivalently, consider the standard symplectic structure $\omega = \Sigma_i dx_i \wedge dy_i$ on $\R^{2n}$. Each 1-dimensional subspace $V$ is isotropic, and has a complementary coisotropic subspace $V^\omega$ that contains it. Projectivized to $\mathbb P(\R^{2n})$, each point in $\mathbb P(\R^{2n})$ has a complementary plane that contains the point. This distribution of planes is isomorphic to the standard contact structure on $\mathbb S^{2n-1}$.

=== One-jet ===
Given a manifold $M$ of dimension $n$, the one-jet space $J^1(M, \R)$ is the space of germs of type $M \to \R$ identified up to order-1 contact. Intuitively, each point in $J^1(M, \R)$ is a mapping from an infinitesimal neighborhood of $M$ to $\R$. Each member of the space can be identified by the three quantities $x \in M, f(x) \in \R, \nabla f(x) \in T^*_x M$, thus $J^1(M, \R)$ is a manifold of dimension $2n+1$ and can be identified with $T^*M \times \R$. It has a natural contact form $\alpha = df - \theta$ given by the tautological 1-form $\theta = \Sigma_{i=1}^n y_i dx_i$. The standard contact structure is the special case where $M = \R^n$.

Any first-differentiable function $M \to \R$ then uniquely lifts to a Legendrian submanifold in $J^1(M, \R)$, and conversely, any Legendrian submanifold is the lift of a first-differentiable function $M \to \R$. Its projection to $M \times \R$ is the graph of the function. This also shows that $J^1(M, \R)$ embeds into the contact bundle of hyperplane elements $C_n(M \times \R)$, defined below.

=== Contact bundle of hyperplane elements ===
Given a manifold $M$ of dimension $n+1$, its n-th contact bundle $C_n M$ is the bundle of its dimension-n contact elements. More abstractly, it is the projectivized cotangent bundle $C_n(M) \cong \mathbb P (T^* M)$. Locally, expand $M$ in coordinates as $q^0, \dots, q^n$, then the contact bundle locally has coordinates $(q^0, \dots, q^n, [p_0, \dots, p_n])$, where $p_0, \dots, p_n$ uses projective coordinates. Any n-submanifold of $M$ uniquely lifts to an n-submanifold of $C_n M$. Conversely, an n-submanifold of $C_n (M)$ is a lift of an n-submanifold of $M$ iff it annihilates the 1-form $\Sigma_{\mu=0}^n p_\mu dq^\mu$. On the subset where $p_0 \neq 0$, the condition becomes $dq^0 + \Sigma_{i=1}^n p_i dq^i$, which is the standard contact structure.

Similarly, the contact bundle of cooriented hyperplane elements $C_n(M)^+ \cong \mathbb S(T^* M)$ is obtained by spherizing the cotangent bundle, i.e. quotienting only by $\R^+$.

The contact structure on $C_n(M)$ can also be described coordinate-free. Define $\pi : C_n(M) \to M$ to be the fiber projection that maps a hyperplane element to its base point. Then, for any $\xi \in C_n(M)$, a local tangent vector $v \in T_\xi C_1(M)$ is a simultaneous translation of the base point and a rotation of the hyperplane element. Then $v$ is in the hyper-hyperplane at $\xi$ iff $\pi(v)$ is in the hyperplane element of $\xi$ itself. In other words, the $2n$-dimensional hyper-hyperplane at $\xi$ is spanned by translation of the base point within $\xi$, as well as rotation of the hyperplane element while keeping its base point unchanged.

Be careful with two meanings of hyperplanes here. A hyperplane element on $M$ is an infinitesimal dimension-n hyperplane in $M$. These are the points of the contact manifold $C_n(M)$. The contact structure of $C_n(M)$ consists of hyperplane elements in $C_n(M)$, which are infinitesimal dimension-2n hyperplanes in $C_n(M)$. The contact structure is not over $M$, which can have even dimensions, whereas $C_n(M)$ necessarily has odd dimensions.

When $M = \R^2$, $C_1M$ is the contact bundle of line elements in the plane, and is homeomorphic to the direct product of the plane with the projective 1-space $\R^2 \times \mathbb P (\R^1)$. The contact structure of $C_1(M)$ looks like plane elements that rotate around their axis as they move along the "vertical" $\mathbb P (\R^1)$ direction, completing a 180° when it finishes one cycle through $\mathbb P (\R^1)$. The standard contact structure in $\R^3$ can then be induced via a map $\R^3 \to \R^2 \times \mathbb P(\R^1)$. Equivalently, the contact structure on $C_1(M)$ can be constructed by gluing $\R^3$ at infinity. However, whereas the contact structure on $\R^3$ is coorientable, that on $C_1 (M)$ is not, since of $\mathbb P (\R^1)$ is not orientable. It can be double-covered by $C_1(M)^+ \cong \R^2 \times \mathbb S^1$, which is coorientable. A circle in the plane lifts to a helix in $C_1(M)^+$, but a double helix in $C_1(M)$.

=== Others ===
Until the 1950s, the only contact manifolds were the above ones, until Boothby and Wang in 1958 made a general construction via contactization.

The Sasakian manifolds are contact manifolds.

Brieskorn manifolds are defined by
$$\Sigma\left(a_0, \ldots, a_n\right)=\left\{\left(z_0, \ldots, z_n\right) \in \mathbb{C}^{n+1} \mid z_0^{a_0}+\cdots+z_n^{a_n}=0\right\} \cap S^{2 n+1}$$
where the $a_j$ are natural numbers $\geq 2$ and $\mathbb S^{2 n+1}$ is the unit sphere in $\mathbb{C}^{n+1}$. It has a contact structure defined by$\frac{i}{2} \Sigma_{j=0}^n\left(z_j d \bar{z}_j-\bar{z}_j d z_j\right)=0$.

Every connected compact orientable three-dimensional manifold admits a contact structure. This result generalizes to any compact almost-contact manifold.

== Contact transformation ==
A contact transformation (or contactomorphism) is a diffeomorphism between two contact manifolds that preserves their contact structure. A contact symmetry is a contact transformation from a contact manifold to itself.

Let $(M, \alpha)$ and $(M', \alpha')$ be two manifolds equipped with contact forms. A diffeomorphism $f : M \to M'$ is a contact transformation iff there exists some $\tau: M \to \R$ that is nowhere zero, such that $f^* \alpha' = \tau \alpha$. If $\tau = 1$ then it is a strict contact transformation. Note that the concept of a strict contact transformation depends on a particular choice of contact forms, and there are inequivalent choices. Therefore, there is no "strict contact transformation" between contact structures, only between contact forms.

A strict infinitesimal contact symmetry on $(M, \alpha)$ is a vector field $V$ such that $\mathcal L_V \alpha = 0$, where $\mathcal L$ is the Lie derivative. An infinitesimal contact symmetry is a vector field $V$ on the contact manifold that generates a one-parameter family of contact symmetries. Equivalently, if the hyperplane distribution is $\ker \alpha$, then the condition is $\mathcal L_V \alpha = \tau \alpha$ for some $\tau: M \to \R$.

=== Examples ===
p is the polar line to point P ; m is the polar line to M. The contact transformation exchanges line elements through P and line elements along line p.

==== Projective geometry ====
Given a conic section in the plane, the polar reciprocation operation is an involutive contact transformation of the contact manifold of line elements in the plane $C(\R^2)$. Though it exchanges points and lines, and thus is not a bijection of the plane, it exchanges line elements, thus is a bijection of the contact manifold. In words, given a line element $l$ through a point $P$, the line element is mapped to a line element $l'$ through a point $P'$, where $l'$ is polar to $P$ and $P'$ is polar to $l$. A curve is decomposed into a succession of tangent line elements, which are mapped to another succession of line elements. This operation exchanges envelopes and loci. In particular, if two nonlinear curves that are in contact at a point, then they remain in contact after reciprocation. This explains the name of "contact transformation".

Similarly, the line-sphere correspondence and other transformations of the Lie sphere geometry are contact transformations. While a line has $\infty^1$ points and a sphere has $\infty^2$ points, they both have $\infty^2$ infinitesimal planes. They were in fact some of the earliest ones considered by Lie.

==== Legendre transformation ====
Given $\R^{2n + 1}$ with the standard contact structure, define its coordinates $(W, q^1, \dots, q^n, p_1, \dots, p_n)$ such that the contact form is $dW - p_i dq^i$, then the Legendre transformation $(W, q, p) \mapsto (W - p_iq^i, p, -q)$ is a strict contact transformation. It is obtained by contact-lifting the linear symplectic rotation $(q, p) \mapsto (p, -q)$ of the symplectic space. This rotation is simply multiply-by-i of the standard linear complex structure on the symplectic space. In the plane, it exchanges a curve and its dual.

Since a differentiable function $F: \R^n \to \R$ can be lifted uniquely to a Legendrian submanifold, and any contactomorphism preserves Legendrian submanifolds, this defines a Legendre transformation on the function $F$ itself.

More generally, any differentiable real-valued function on any manifold $M$ can be transformed using any contactomorphism on the one-jet space $J^1(M, \R)$. In particular, this defines the Legendre transformation for any manifold.

==== Canonical transformation ====
Given a manifold $M$ with coordinates $(q^1, \dots, q^n)$, let $\theta = p_i dq^i$ be the tautological one-form on its phase space $P = T^* M$, and let $\omega = dp_i \wedge dq^i = d\theta$ be the symplectic form on the phase space. Extend by one dimension to $\R\times P$ with coordinates $(W, q^1, \dots, q^n, p_1, \dots, p_n)$, then we have a contact manifold with the contact form $dW - \theta$. This can be interpreted as a lift of the Hamilton–Jacobi equation in time-independent Hamiltonian dynamics, with $W$ being Hamilton's characteristic function. A canonical transformation $\Phi: P \to P$ generated by $F: P \to \R$ satisfies $\Phi^* \theta = \theta + dF$, and it lifts to a contact transformation $\hat \Phi : \R \times P \to \R \times P$ by $\hat \Phi(W, q, p) = (W + F(q, p), \Phi(q, p))$.

==== Others ====
Given any contact form, its corresponding Reeb vector field is a strict infinitesimal contact symmetry, and the Reeb flow is a one-parameter family of contact symmetries. The codeodesic flow is one example.

For the standard contact form on an odd-dimensional sphere, its Reeb flow generates its Hopf fibration.

== Submanifolds ==
=== Contact ===
Given a contact manifold $(M, \alpha)$, a contact submanifold is some submanifold $L \subset M$ such that $(L, \alpha|_L)$ is a contact submanifold.

=== Isotropic ===
Given a contact manifold $(M, \alpha)$, an isotropic submanifold (or integral submanifold) is some submanifold $L \subset M$ such that for any point $p \in L$, the tangent space is within the distribution $T_p L \subset \ker\alpha$, that is, $\alpha|_L = 0$.

In particular, since $(d\alpha)^n \wedge \alpha \neq 0$, at any point $p \in L$, $d\alpha_p$ is a symplectic form on the hyperplane at $p$. Yet, we must also have $d\alpha|_L = 0$, so $T_p L$ is a null space in the local hyperplane, which must have dimension at most $n$.

=== Legendrian ===
As described above, an integral manifold can have up to n dimensions. These extremal integral manifolds are Legendrian submanifolds. Indeed, such submanifolds are extremely common, since they satisfy an h-principle:

Given local Darboux coordinates such that $\alpha = d z - \Sigma_{i=1}^n y_i dx_i$, any partition of the index set $\{1, \dots, n\} = I \cup J$, and any smooth function $F(x_I, y_J): \R^n \to \R$,
$$y_I=\frac{\partial F}{\partial x_I}, \quad
x_J=-\frac{\partial F}{\partial y_J}, \quad
z=F-x_I \frac{\partial F}{\partial x_I}$$
defines a Legendrian submanifold parameterized by $(x_I, y_J)$. Conversely, any Legendrian submanifold is locally of this form. Thus, each Legendrian submanifold is entirely specified by its (local) generating functions.

It is an h-principle, since any such Legendrian submanifold is homotopic to the somewhat trivial one defined by $F(x_I, y_J) = 0$.

Given two Legendrian submanifolds $L_0 \subset M_0, \; L_1 \subset M_1$, if there exists a diffeomorphism mapping $L_0$ to $L_1$, then it can be extended to a contactomorphism from a neighborhood of $L_0 \subset M_0$ to a neighborhood of $L_1 \subset M_1$. Since locally, any two Legendrian n-submanifolds are diffeomorphic to $\R^n$, this immediately implies that around any point $p \in L$ there exists a local coordinate system in which $L$ is defined by $y_i = 0, z = 0$, and $\alpha = dz - \Sigma_{i=1}^n y_i dx_i$.

Furthermore, this allows a form of global Darboux theorem for Legendrian submanifolds. For example, for any Legendrian knot in any contact 3-manifold, there exists a neighborhood that is contactomorphic to the standard Legendrian unknot in $\R^2 \times \mathbb S^1$, so there exists a local coordinate system $(x, y, \theta)$ around the knot, in which the knot is $x = 0, y = 0$, and the contact form is $\alpha = \cos\theta dx - \sin\theta dy$.

A Legendrian fibration is a partition of the manifold into Legendrian submanifolds. The standard contact form $\alpha = dz - \Sigma_{i=1}^n y_i dx_i$ has a standard Legendrian fibration defined as the fibers of $(x, y, z) \mapsto (x, z)$. An equivalence of Legendre fibrations is a contactomorphism that preserves the Legendrian submanifolds too. As yet another Darboux phenomenon, any Legendrian fibration is locally the standard Legendrian fibration.

Legendrian submanifolds are analogous to Lagrangian submanifolds of symplectic manifolds. There is a precise relation: the lift of a Legendrian submanifold in a symplectization of a contact manifold is a Lagrangian submanifold.

The simplest example of Legendrian submanifolds are curves inside a contact 3-manifold. When the curve is closed, it is a Legendrian knot. Inequivalent Legendrian knots may be equivalent as smooth knots; that is, there are Legendrian knots which are smoothly isotopic to each other, but at least one intermediate knot during the isotopy must not be Legendrian. This is because Legendrian knots are rigid.

In general, Legendrian submanifolds are very rigid objects; typically there are infinitely many Legendrian isotopy classes of embeddings which are all smoothly isotopic. Symplectic field theory provides invariants of Legendrian submanifolds called relative contact homology that can sometimes distinguish distinct Legendrian submanifolds that are topologically identical (i.e. smoothly isotopic).

== Vector fields ==
=== Liouville ===
In a symplectic manifold $(P, \omega)$, a vector field $X$ is (locally) Liouville iff $\mathcal L_X \omega = \omega$. By Cartan's magic formula, this is equivalent to $d(\omega(X, \cdot)) = \omega$. Since a tautological 1-form $\theta = \Sigma_i p_i dq^i$, when differentiated, creates a symplectic form $\omega = d\theta$, a Liouville vector field can be interpreted as a way to recover the tautological 1-form, i.e. identifying the symplectic manifold (locally) with the standard one $T^* \R^n$.

A Liouville form is any 1-form $\lambda$ such that $\omega = d\lambda$. The tautological 1-form is an example.

=== Reeb ===
Given a contact form $\alpha$ on a manifold $M$, it has a Reeb vector field, or characteristic vector field $R$, given by
$$d\alpha(R, \cdot) = 0, \; \alpha(R) = 1$$
In local Darboux coordinates, $\alpha = d z - \Sigma_{i=1}^n y_i dx_i, \; R = \partial_z$. In particular, it shows that it is uniquely defined.

By Cartan's magic formula, this implies $\mathcal L_R \alpha = 0$, i.e. the Reeb vector field is a strict infinitesimal contact transformation of $(M, \alpha)$. Visually, if the contact form is drawn as paired hyperplane elements, then the paired hyperplane elements are preserved under Reeb vector flow.

Because the Reeb field for $\alpha$ and $f\alpha$ are not parallel in general, the Reeb field is not a part of the contact structure, but rather, of the contact dynamics.

If a contact form arises as a constant-energy hypersurface inside a symplectic manifold, then the Reeb vector field is the restriction to the submanifold of the Hamiltonian vector field associated to the energy function. (The restriction yields a vector field on the contact hypersurface because the Hamiltonian vector field preserves energy levels.)

The dynamics of the Reeb field can be used to study the structure of the contact manifold or even the underlying manifold using techniques of Floer homology such as symplectic field theory and, in three dimensions, embedded contact homology. Different contact forms whose kernels give the same contact structure will yield different Reeb vector fields, whose dynamics are in general very different. The various flavors of contact homology depend a priori on the choice of a contact form, and construct algebraic structures the closed trajectories of their Reeb vector fields; however, these algebraic structures turn out to be independent of the contact form, i.e. they are invariants of the underlying contact structure, so that in the end, the contact form may be seen as an auxiliary choice. In the case of embedded contact homology, one obtains an invariant of the underlying three-manifold, i.e. the embedded contact homology is independent of contact structure; this allows one to obtain results that hold for any Reeb vector field on the manifold.

The Reeb field is named after Georges Reeb.

== Relation with symplectic geometry ==
There are many constructions relating contact geometry and symplectic geometry, often motivated by physics. Because a symplectic form is even-dimensional, while a contact form is odd-dimensional, any operation must cross the dimension. Concretely, this means that a relation is typically between a contact manifold of dimension $2n-1$ or $2n+1$ with a symplectic manifold of dimension $2n$.

=== Contactification ===
Given a symplectic $2n$-manifold $(P, \omega)$, if its the symplectic form is not just closed but also exact, then let $\omega = d\theta$ for some 1-form $\theta$ on it. Then $(P \times \R, \alpha)$ where $\alpha := dW - \theta$ is a contact manifold.

This construction requires the cohomology class of $\omega$ to be trivial. If it is $\Z$, then it can be contactified with the Boothby–Wang construction. Assume $[\omega] / 2 \pi \in H^2(P ; \mathbb{Z})$. Take a principal $\mathbb S^1$-bundle $\pi: Y \rightarrow P$ with Euler class $[\omega] / 2 \pi$. Any connection 1-form $\alpha$ that satisfies the curvature condition $d \alpha =\pi^* \omega$ is a contact form. Different choices of the connection form $\alpha$ are isotopic as contact forms. The Reeb field generates the $\mathbb S^1$-action and $\pi:(Y, \operatorname{ker} \alpha) \rightarrow(P, \omega)$ is the prequantization fibration.

=== Liouville transversal construction ===
Given a symplectic manifold $(P, \omega)$ and a Liouville vector field $X$ on it: $\mathcal L_X \omega = \omega$, define the 1-form $\alpha := \omega(X, \cdot)$, then by Cartan's magic formula, $d\alpha = \omega$, so $\alpha \wedge d\alpha^{n-1} = \tfrac 1n \iota_X(\omega^n)$. In particular, if $M \subset P$ is a $(2n-1)$-submanifold that is everywhere transverse to $X$, then $(M, \alpha|_M)$ is a contact manifold.

In general, define a contact type submanifold of the original symplectic manifold to be a codimension-1 submanifold that is transverse to some Liouville vector field. This construction shows that any contact type submanifold can be given a globally defined contact form, so it is coorientable.

Since a contact type submanifold is pierced through with Liouville vectors, $P$ locally looks like $M \times \R$, and suggests a reverse operation that extends a contact manifold to a symplectic manifold. Indeed, symplectization is a strict inverse to this operation in the following sense:

Given a symplectic manifold $(P, \omega)$ and a compact and contact type $M \subset P$, construct a contact manifold $(M, \alpha|_M)$ as described, then construct a positive (since $M$ is coorientable) symplectization $(P^+, \omega')$ where $P^+ = M \times \R^+$. Then there exists a neighborhood of $M \subset P$ and a neighborhood of $M\times \{1\} \subset P^+$ that are symplectically isomorphic.

=== Reeb transversal construction ===
Given a contact manifold $(M, \alpha)$, construct local Darboux coordinates so that $\alpha = dW - \theta$, with $\theta = p_i dq^i$, then $d\alpha = -d \theta = \omega$, where $\omega = dq^i \wedge dp_i$, and the Reeb vector field $R = \partial_W$. Thus, if $P \subset M$ is any $2n$-submanifold that is transverse to the Reeb vector field, then $(P, d\alpha|_P)$ is a symplectic manifold. The Reeb vector field flow provides symplectomorphic homotopy between these, another instance of the h-principle.

=== Symplectization ===
Given any contact manifold $M$ of dimension $2n-1$ with a distribution of hyperplanes $\xi$, it can be symplectized to a symplectic manifold $(P, \omega)$ of dimension $2n$. The manifold consists of covectors of $M$ that are in full contact with the distribution of hyperplanes:
$$P := \{(p, w) : p \in M, w \in T_p^* M, \ker w \in \xi\}$$
This produces $\theta$, a global tautological 1-form on $P$. Any vector $V \in T_{(p, w)}P$ projects down to a vector $v \in T_pM$, and we define $\theta(V) := w(v)$. Then define $\omega := d\theta$. This is a symplectic form, as can be verified by constructing local Darboux coordinates. For example, given an n-manifold $M$, its contact bundle $C_{n-1}(M)$ symplectizes to $T^*M \setminus \{0\}$, the nonzero cotangent bundle.

This construction does not depend on the choice of contact form. If a contact form $\alpha$ were locally chosen, then
$$P := \{(p, r\alpha_p) : p \in M,  r \in \R \setminus\{0\}\}$$
and $\omega = d(r\alpha)$. $P$ is a fiber bundle over $M$, with fibers being $\R \setminus \{0\}$. If the contact structure is coorientable, then the contact form can be chosen globally, and the fiber bundle splits into two trivial line bundles:
$$P^\pm := \{(p, r\alpha_p) : p \in M,  \pm r > 0\} \cong M \times \R$$
There is a bijection between 1-homogeneous infinitesimal symplectomorphisms of the symplectic manifold and infinitesimal contactomorphisms of the contact manifold. In one direction, given a vector field $v$ on $M$ that is an infinitesimal contactomorphism, it flows any $(p, w) \in P$ to some $(p', w')$. Since it preserves the contact structure, $(p', w') \in P$. Further, for any $k \in \R \setminus \{0\}$, it flows $(p, kw)$ to $(p', kw')$. Thus it lifts to a vector field $V$ on $P$. This is an infinitesimal symplectomorphism that is 1-homogeneous along the fibers. Conversely, any infinitesimal symplectomorphism that is 1-homogeneous along the fibers projects down to infinitesimal contactomorphism.

Say that a Hamiltonian $H : P \to \R$ is 1-homogeneous iff
$$H(p, kw) = k H(p, w), \quad \forall (p, w) \in P, \; k \in \R\setminus\{0\}$$
then every infinitesimal contactomorphism of $P$ is the projection of a Hamiltonian flow of $P$ generated by some 1-homogeneous Hamiltonian. This is a Lie algebra isomorphism between infinitesimal contactomorphisms and infinitesimal symplectomorphisms. This translates the well-developed theory of Hamiltonian flows to the theory of contact flows.

=== Contact Hamiltonian flow ===
Analogous to how a real-valued function (a Hamiltonian) on a symplectic manifold generates a flow, a real-valued function on a contact manifold generates a flow, which may be called a contact Hamiltonian.

Fix a contact form $\alpha$ on $M$. Given any contact flow $v$ on $M$, use the previous construction to lift to a symplectic flow $V$ on $P$, generated by a 1-homogeneous Hamiltonian $H: P \to \R$. This then projects back to a contact Hamiltonian $K : M \to \R$ defined by $K(p) = H(p, \alpha_p)$. It turns out that $K(p) = \alpha(v_p)$, or more succinctly, $K = \alpha(v)$.

The flow preserves an integral submanifold iff $K = 0$ on the submanifold.

=== Energy surfaces ===
Suppose that H is a smooth function on T*M, that E is a regular value for H, so that the level set $L=\{(q,p)\in T^*M\mid H(q,p)=E\}$ is a smooth submanifold of codimension 1. A vector field Y is called an Euler (or Liouville) vector field if it is transverse to L and symplectic, meaning that the Lie derivative $\mathcal L_Y \omega = \omega$. In fact, being conformally symplectic is enough, meaning $\mathcal L_Y \omega = f \omega$ for some nowhere zero function $f$. Then $\omega(Y, \cdot)$ is a contact form on L.

This construction originates in Hamiltonian mechanics, where $M$ is a configuration space, $T^* M$ is the phase space, $H: T^*M \to \R$ is the Hamiltonian, and $E$ is the energy. If $T^*M$ has the standard coordinates $p_i, q^i$, then let $\theta = p_i dq^i$ be the tautological 1-form, a Liouville vector field can be defined by $\omega(Y, \cdot) = \theta$. In particular, $Y = p_i \partial_{q^i}$ is Liouville.

More generally, if $P$ is a symplectic manifold with an exact symplectic form $\omega = d\theta$, and $\omega(Y, \cdot) = \theta$, then $Y$ is Liouville.

== Topology ==
The topology of contact 3-manifolds is best understood. Given any oriented 3-manifold, there are infinitely many distinct contact structures on it. One can be constructed by performing surgery along a Legendrian link on the 3-sphere with its standard contact structure. Given any contact structure on it, applying the Lutz twist repeatedly then creates an infinite number of non-isomorphic contact structures, which are overtwisted. Any structure not overtwisted is called tight. The standard contact structure on the sphere is the only tight one possible up to isotopy.

The Giroux theorem shows that oriented contact 3-manifolds are, up to isotopy, bijective to open book decompositions up to "positive stabilization". Thus the geometry of oriented contact 3-manifolds is entirely topological.

The Weinstein conjecture is an open question asking whether on a compact contact manifold, any Reeb flow always contains a cycle. It has been proven in the 3-dimensional case.

For any geometric structure of a given type, it is important to understand whether it admits continuous deformations into non-equivalent structures. In complex structures, this is possible, leading to Teichmüller theory of Riemann surfaces and Kodaira–Spencer deformation theory. The Gray stability theorem shows that contact structures on closed manifolds cannot be deformed to a non-equivalent structure. Specifically:

If $M$ is a closed manifold, and $\alpha_t$ is a smooth 1-parameter family of contact forms on $M$, then there exists an isotopy $\phi_t$ of $M$ such that $\phi_t^* (\ker\alpha_t) = \ker\alpha_0$.

The theorem does not hold for contact forms.

== History ==
Concepts of contact geometry appear implicitly in work of Apollonius of Perga, Christiaan Huygens, Isaac Barrow, and Isaac Newton. The theory of contact transformations was developed by Sophus Lie, with the dual aims of studying differential equations (e.g. the Legendre transformation or canonical transformation) and describing the 'change of space element', familiar from projective duality.

The first known use of the term "contact manifold" appears in a paper of 1958.

== Applications ==
Like symplectic geometry, contact geometry has broad applications in physics, e.g. geometrical optics, classical mechanics, thermodynamics, geometric quantization, integrable systems and to control theory. Contact geometry also has applications to low-dimensional topology; for example, it has been used by Kronheimer and Mrowka to prove the property P conjecture, by Michael Hutchings to define an invariant of smooth three-manifolds, and by Lenhard Ng to define invariants of knots. It was also used by Yakov Eliashberg to derive a topological characterization of Stein manifolds of dimension at least six.

Contact geometry has been used to describe the visual cortex.

=== Partial differential equations ===
The original motivation for the study of contact geometry was in solving first-order partial differential equations (PDE). In general, the problem is finding some $z(x_1, \dots, x_n)$ satisfying a PDE
$$F(x_1, \dots, x_n, \partial_1 z, \dots, \partial_n z, z) = 0$$
Sophus Lie's idea was to lift the equation to 1-jet space $J^1(\R^n, \R)$, in which the equation $F(x, y, z) = 0$ specifies a 2n-dimensional hypersurface, and the problem reduces to finding Legendrian submanifolds within this hypersurface.

=== Geometric optics ===
Along a constant-speed geodesic curve, the unit velocity vector is transported, creating the geodesic flow on the unit tangent bundle. Dually, the unit co-vector is also transported, creating the cogeodesic flow on the unit cotangent bundle. The (co)geodesic flow is a special case of the Reeb flow.

The Huygens–Fresnel principle of wave propagation can be formalized as a contact transformation. Specifically, given a Riemannian n-manifold $M$, consider its unit-speed geodesic curves (i.e. parameterized by arc length). This produces a transport of unit-length tangent vectors, and thus a vector flow field on the unit tangent bundle $UT(M)$. This is the geodesic flow. Dually, the propagation of infinitesimal wavefronts (wavelets) produces a transport of unit-length cotangent vectors, and thus a vector flow field on the unit cotangent bundle $UT^*(M)$. This is the cogeodesic flow. The tautological 1-form on $T^*M$ restricted to $UT^*(M)$ is a contact form, which then induces a contact in $UT(M)$. The Huygens–Fresnel principle states that the (co)geodesic flow is a strict infinitesimal contact symmetry, and more precisely, it is the Reeb vector field. This construction directly generalizes to (co)geodesic flows on Finsler manifolds.

Legendrian submanifolds in $UT^*(M)$ correspond to wavefront surfaces in $M$, and wave propagation over time corresponds to applying Reeb flow to the wavefront Legendrian submanifold. Legendrian submanifolds in $UT(M)$ correspond to special types of pencils of rays, and Reeb flow corresponds to ray propagation over time. That Reeb flow preserves Legendrian submanifolds implies the Malus–Dupin theorem. In particular, a single point source can be regarded either as a sphere of exiting rays, or a sphere of exiting wavefronts. They are both maximally extended compact Legendrian submanifolds.

Tangents and involutes of the cubic curve $y = x^3$.

For example, wave propagation in the plane at constant speed is particularly simple, and becomes a helical shearing in $UT^*(\R^2) \cong \R^2 \times \mathbb S^1$. Circular wavefronts exiting a single point in the plane is lifted to a helix exiting a single line in $\R^2 \times \mathbb S^1$. Given an involute of an evolute, the other involutes are obtained by the one-parameter family of contact transformations.

Conversely, any infinitesimal contact transformation can be cast into the form of wave propagation.

=== Thermodynamics ===
Classical thermodynamics studies systems in thermal equilibrium. Given a thermodynamic system, let $M$ be the manifold of thermodynamic states. The laws of thermodynamics imply that there is a contact structure on $M$. Specifically, there exists a system of coordinates:

- extensive quantities $q^1, \dots, q^n$
- their Legendre-conjugate intensive quantities $p_1, \dots, p_n$
- entropy $S$

such that, defining $\alpha := dS - \Sigma_{i=1}^n p_i dq^i$, the space of reachable states is an n-dimensional Legendrian submanifold $L$. Each Legendrian manifold is specified locally by equations
$$p_I=\frac{\partial F}{\partial q^I}, \quad
q^J=-\frac{\partial F}{\partial p_J}, \quad
z=F-q^I \frac{\partial F}{\partial q^I}$$
Interpreted thermodynamically, the first n are the equations of state, while the last equation is the fundamental relation. Legendre transforms are special cases of contact transformations.

For example, for the formulation of gas laws, the contact form is
$$d S- p_U d U - p_V d V- p_N d N, \quad p_U=\frac{1}{T}, \quad p_V=\frac{p}{T}, \quad p_N=-\frac{\mu}{T}$$
For any specific gas system, its reachable states is a 3-dimensional Legendrian submanifold. By changing the fundamental relation, all possible gas systems allowed by classical thermodynamics can be specified.

== See also ==
- Floer homology, some flavors of which give invariants of contact manifolds and their Legendrian submanifolds
- Sub-Riemannian geometry
- Contact bundle
