= Gennadi Sardanashvily =

Russian physicist

- Born: March 13, 1950; Moscow, Soviet Union
- Died: September 1, 2016 (aged 66)
- Citizenship: Russia
- Education: Moscow State University (1973)
- Scientific career
- Fields: Theoretical Physics
- Workplaces: Department of Theoretical Physics Moscow State University
- Doctoral advisor: Dmitri Ivanenko

Gennadi Sardanashvily (Russian: Генна́дий Алекса́ндрович Сарданашви́ли; March 13, 1950 – September 1, 2016) was a theoretical physicist, a principal research scientist of Moscow State University.

== Biography ==
Gennadi Sardanashvily graduated from Moscow State University (MSU) in 1973, he was a Ph.D. student of the Department of Theoretical Physics (MSU) in 1973–76, where he held a position in 1976.

He attained his Ph.D. degree in physics and mathematics from MSU, in 1980, with Dmitri Ivanenko as his supervisor, and his D.Sc. degree in physics and mathematics from MSU, in 1998.

Gennadi Sardanashvily was the founder and Managing Editor (2003 - 2013) of the International Journal of Geometric Methods in Modern Physics (IJGMMP).

He was a member of Lepage Research Institute (Slovakia).

== Research area ==
Gennadi Sardanashvily research area is geometric method in classical and quantum mechanics and field theory, gravitation theory. His main achievement is geometric formulation of classical field theory and non-autonomous mechanics including:

- gauge gravitation theory, where gravity is treated as a classical Higgs field associated to a reduced Lorentz structure on a world manifold
- geometric formulation of classical field theory and Lagrangian BRST theory where classical fields are represented by sections of fiber bundles and their dynamics is described in terms of jet manifolds and the variational bicomplex (covariant classical field theory)
- covariant (polysymplectic) Hamiltonian field theory, where momenta correspond to derivatives of fields with respect to all world coordinates
- the second Noether theorem in a very general setting of reducible degenerate Grassmann-graded Lagrangian systems on an arbitrary manifold
- geometric formulation of classical and quantum non-autonomous mechanics on fiber bundles over $\mathbb R$
- generalization of the Liouville–Arnold, Nekhoroshev and Mishchenko–Fomenko theorems on completely and partially integrable and superintegrable Hamiltonian systems to the case of non-compact invariant submanifolds
- cohomology of the variational bicomplex of graded differential forms of finite jet order on an infinite order jet manifold.

Gennadi Sardanashvily has published more than 400 scientific works, including 28 books.

== Selected monographs ==
- Sardanashvily, G.; Zakharov, O. (1992), Gauge Gravitation Theory, World Scientific, ISBN 981-02-0799-9.
- Sardanashvily, G. (1993), Gauge Theory on Jet Manifolds, Hadronic Press, ISBN 0-911767-60-6.
- Sardanashvily, G. (1995), Generalized Hamiltonian Formalism for Field Theory, World Scientific, ISBN 981-02-2045-6.
- Giachetta, G.; Mangiarotti, L.; Sardanashvily, G. (1997), New Lagrangian and Hamiltonian Methods in Field Theory, World Scientific, ISBN 981-02-1587-8.
- Mangiarotti, L.; Sardanashvily, G. (1998), Gauge Mechanics, World Scientific, ISBN 981-02-3603-4.
- Mangiarotti, L.; Sardanashvily, G. (2000), Connections in Classical and Quantum Field Theory, World Scientific, ISBN 981-02-2013-8.
- Giachetta, G.; Mangiarotti, L.; Sardanashvily, G. (2005), Geometric and Algebraic Topological Methods in Quantum Mechanics, World Scientific, ISBN 981-256-129-3.
- Giachetta, G.; Mangiarotti, L.; Sardanashvily, G. (2009), Advanced Classical Field Theory, World Scientific, ISBN 978-981-283-895-7.
- Giachetta, G.; Mangiarotti, L.; Sardanashvily, G. (2011), Geometric formulation of classical and quantum mechanics, World Scientific, ISBN 978-981-4313-72-8.
- Sardanashvily, G. (2012), Lectures on Differential Geometry of Modules and Rings. Application to Quantum Theory, Lambert Academic Publishing, ISBN 978-3-659-23806-2.
- Sardanashvily, G. (2013), Advanced Differential Geometry for Theoreticians. Fiber bundles, jet manifolds and Lagrangian theory, Lambert Academic Publishing, ISBN 978-3-659-37815-7.
- Sardanashvily, G. (2015), Handbook of Integrable Hamiltonian Systems, URSS, ISBN 978-5-396-00687-4.
- Sardanashvily, G. (2016), Noether's Theorems. Applications in Mechanics and Field Theory, Springer, ISBN 978-94-6239-171-0.
