= De Donder–Weyl theory =

In mathematical physics, the De Donder–Weyl theory is a generalization of the Hamiltonian formalism in the calculus of variations and classical field theory over spacetime which treats the space and time coordinates on equal footing. In this framework, the Hamiltonian formalism in mechanics is generalized to field theory in the way that a field is represented as a system that varies both in space and in time. This generalization is different from the canonical Hamiltonian formalism in field theory which treats space and time variables differently and describes classical fields as infinite-dimensional systems evolving in time.

De Donder–Weyl equations:
$\partial p^{i}_a / \partial x^{i} = -\partial H / \partial y^{a}$
$\partial y^{a} / \partial x^{i} = \partial H / \partial p^{i}_a$

== De Donder–Weyl formulation of field theory ==
The De Donder–Weyl theory is based on a change of variables known as Legendre transformation. Let x^{i} be spacetime coordinates, for i = 1 to n (with n = 4 representing 3 + 1 dimensions of space and time), and y^{a} field variables, for a = 1 to m, and L the Lagrangian density

$$L = L(y^{a},\partial_i y^{a},x^{i})$$

With the polymomenta p^{i}_{a} defined as

$$p^{i}_a = \partial L / \partial (\partial_i y^{a})$$

and the De Donder–Weyl Hamiltonian function H defined as

$$H = p^{i}_a \partial_i y^{a} - L$$

the De Donder–Weyl equations are:

$$\partial p^{i}_a / \partial x^{i} = -\partial H / \partial y^{a} \, , \, \partial y^{a} / \partial x^{i} = \partial H / \partial p^{i}_a$$

This De Donder–Weyl Hamiltonian form of field equations is covariant and it is equivalent to the Euler–Lagrange equations when the Legendre transformation to the variables p^{i}_{a} and H is not singular. The theory is a formulation of a covariant Hamiltonian field theory which is different from the canonical Hamiltonian formalism and for n = 1 it reduces to Hamiltonian mechanics (see also action principle in the calculus of variations).

Hermann Weyl in 1935 has developed the Hamilton–Jacobi theory for the De Donder–Weyl theory.

Similarly to the Hamiltonian formalism in mechanics formulated using the symplectic geometry of phase space, the De Donder–Weyl theory can be formulated using the multisymplectic geometry or polysymplectic geometry and the geometry of jet bundles.

A generalization of the Poisson brackets to the De Donder–Weyl theory and the representation of De Donder–Weyl equations in terms of generalized Poisson brackets satisfying the Gerstenhaber algebra was found by Kanatchikov in 1993.

== History ==
The formalism, now known as De Donder–Weyl (DW) theory, was developed by Théophile De Donder and Hermann Weyl. Hermann Weyl made his proposal in 1934 being inspired by the work of Constantin Carathéodory, which in turn was founded on the work of Vito Volterra. The work of De Donder on the other hand started from the theory of integral invariants of Élie Cartan. The De Donder–Weyl theory has been a part of the calculus of variations since the 1930s and initially it found very few applications in physics. Recently it was applied in theoretical physics in the context of quantum field theory and quantum gravity.

In 1970, Jedrzej Śniatycki, the author of Geometric quantization and quantum mechanics, developed an invariant geometrical formulation of jet bundles, building on the work of De Donder and Weyl. In 1999 Igor Kanatchikov has shown that the De Donder–Weyl covariant Hamiltonian field equations can be formulated in terms of Duffin–Kemmer–Petiau matrices.

== See also ==
- Hamiltonian field theory
- Covariant Hamiltonian field theory
