= Gauge group (mathematics) =

Group of gauge symmetries in Yang–Mills theory

A gauge group is a group of gauge symmetries of the Yang–Mills gauge theory of principal connections on a principal bundle. Given a principal bundle $P\to X$ with a structure Lie group $G$, a gauge group is defined to be a group of its vertical automorphisms, that is, its group of bundle automorphisms. This group is isomorphic to the group $G(X)$ of global sections of the associated group bundle $\widetilde P\to X$ whose typical fiber is a group $G$ which acts on itself by the adjoint representation. The unit element of $G(X)$ is a constant unit-valued section $g(x)=1$ of $\widetilde P\to X$.

At the same time, gauge gravitation theory exemplifies field theory on a principal frame bundle whose gauge symmetries are general covariant transformations which are not elements of a gauge group.

In the physical literature on gauge theory, a structure group of a principal bundle often is called the gauge group.

In quantum gauge theory, one considers a normal subgroup $G^0(X)$ of a gauge group $G(X)$ which is the stabilizer

$$G^0(X)=\{g(x)\in G(X)\quad : \quad g(x_0)=1\in \widetilde P_{x_0}\}$$

of some point $1\in \widetilde P_{x_0}$ of a group bundle $\widetilde P\to X$. It is called the pointed gauge group. This group acts freely on a space of principal connections. Obviously, $G(X)/G^0(X)=G$. One also introduces the effective gauge group $\overline G(X)=G(X)/Z$ where $Z$ is the center of a gauge group $G(X)$. This group $\overline G(X)$ acts freely on a space of irreducible principal connections.

If a structure group $G$ is a complex semisimple matrix group, the Sobolev completion $\overline G_k(X)$ of a gauge group $G(X)$ can be introduced. It is a Lie group. A key point is that the action of $\overline G_k(X)$ on a Sobolev completion $A_k$ of a space of principal connections is smooth, and that an orbit space $A_k/\overline G_k(X)$ is a Hilbert space. It is a configuration space of quantum gauge theory.

== See also ==
- Gauge symmetry (mathematics)
- Gauge theory
- Gauge theory (mathematics)
- Principal bundle
