= Gauge symmetry (mathematics) =

Differential operator acting on vector bundles

In mathematics, any Lagrangian system generally admits gauge symmetries, though it may happen that they are trivial. In theoretical physics, the notion of gauge symmetries depending on parameter functions is a cornerstone of contemporary field theory.

A gauge symmetry of a Lagrangian $L$ is defined as a differential operator on some vector bundle $E$ taking its values in the linear space of (variational or exact) symmetries of $L$. Therefore, a gauge symmetry of $L$ depends on sections of $E$ and their partial derivatives. For instance, this is the case of gauge symmetries in classical field theory. Yang–Mills gauge theory and gauge gravitation theory exemplify classical field theories with gauge symmetries.

Gauge symmetries possess the following two peculiarities.

1. Being Lagrangian symmetries, gauge symmetries of a Lagrangian satisfy Noether's first theorem, but the corresponding conserved current $J^\mu$ takes a particular superpotential form $J^\mu=W^\mu + d_\nu U^{\nu\mu}$ where the first term $W^\mu$ vanishes on solutions of the Euler–Lagrange equations and the second one is a boundary term, where $U^{\nu\mu}$ is called a superpotential.
2. In accordance with Noether's second theorem, there is one-to-one correspondence between the gauge symmetries of a Lagrangian and the Noether identities which the Euler–Lagrange operator satisfies. Consequently, gauge symmetries characterize the degeneracy of a Lagrangian system.

Note that, in quantum field theory, a generating functional may fail to be invariant under gauge transformations, and gauge symmetries are replaced with the BRST symmetries, depending on ghosts and acting both on fields and ghosts.

== See also ==
- Gauge theory (mathematics)
- Lagrangian system
- Noether identities
- Gauge theory
- Gauge symmetry
- Yang–Mills theory
- Gauge group (mathematics)
- Gauge gravitation theory
