= Connection (composite bundle) =

Composite bundles $Y\to \Sigma \to X$ play a prominent role in gauge theory with symmetry breaking, e.g., gauge gravitation theory, non-autonomous mechanics where $X=\mathbb R$ is the time axis, e.g., mechanics with time-dependent parameters, and so on. There are the important relations between connections on fiber bundles $Y\to X$, $Y\to \Sigma$ and $\Sigma\to X$.

== Composite bundle ==
In differential geometry by a composite bundle is meant the composition

$$\pi: Y\to \Sigma\to X  \qquad\qquad (1)$$

of fiber bundles

$$\pi_{Y\Sigma}: Y\to\Sigma, \qquad  \pi_{\Sigma X}: \Sigma\to X.$$

It is provided with bundle coordinates $(x^\lambda,\sigma^m,y^i)$, where $(x^\lambda,\sigma^m)$ are bundle coordinates on a fiber bundle $\Sigma\to X$, i.e., transition functions of coordinates $\sigma^m$ are independent of coordinates $y^i$.

The following fact provides the above-mentioned physical applications of composite bundles. Given the composite bundle (1), let $h$ be a global section of a fiber bundle $\Sigma\to X$, if any. Then the pullback bundle $Y^h=h^*Y$ over $X$ is a subbundle of a fiber bundle $Y\to X$.

== Composite principal bundle ==
For instance, let $P\to X$ be a principal bundle with a structure Lie group $G$ which is reducible to its closed subgroup $H$. There is a composite bundle $P\to P/H\to X$ where $P\to P/H$ is a principal bundle with a structure group $H$ and $P/H\to X$ is a fiber bundle associated with $P\to X$. Given a global section $h$ of $P/H\to X$, the pullback bundle $h^*P$ is a reduced principal subbundle of $P$ with a structure group $H$. In gauge theory, sections of $P/H\to X$ are treated as classical Higgs fields.

== Jet manifolds of a composite bundle ==
Given the composite bundle $Y\to \Sigma\to X$ (1), consider the jet manifolds $J^1\Sigma$, $J^1_\Sigma Y$, and $J^1Y$ of the fiber bundles $\Sigma\to X$, $Y\to \Sigma$, and $Y\to X$, respectively. They are provided with the adapted coordinates $( x^\lambda,\sigma^m, \sigma^m_\lambda)$, $(x^\lambda, \sigma^m, y^i, \widehat y^i_\lambda, y^i_m),$, and $(x^\lambda, \sigma^m, y^i, \sigma^m_\lambda ,y^i_\lambda).$

There is the canonical map

$$J^1\Sigma\times_\Sigma J^1_\Sigma Y\to_Y J^1Y, \qquad
y^i_\lambda=y^i_m \sigma^m_\lambda +\widehat y^i_\lambda$$.

== Composite connection ==
This canonical map defines the relations between connections on fiber bundles $Y\to X$, $Y\to\Sigma$ and $\Sigma\to X$. These connections are given by the corresponding tangent-valued connection forms

$$\gamma=dx^\lambda\otimes (\partial_\lambda +\gamma_\lambda^m\partial_m + \gamma_\lambda^i\partial_i),$$

$$A_\Sigma=dx^\lambda\otimes (\partial_\lambda + A_\lambda^i\partial_i) +d\sigma^m\otimes (\partial_m + A_m^i\partial_i),$$

$$\Gamma=dx^\lambda\otimes (\partial_\lambda + \Gamma_\lambda^m\partial_m).$$

A connection $A_\Sigma$ on a fiber bundle $Y\to\Sigma$ and a connection $\Gamma$ on a fiber bundle $\Sigma\to X$ define a connection

$$\gamma=dx^\lambda\otimes (\partial_\lambda +\Gamma_\lambda^m\partial_m + (A_\lambda^i +
A_m^i\Gamma_\lambda^m)\partial_i)$$

on a composite bundle $Y\to X$. It is called the composite connection. This is a unique connection such that the horizontal lift $\gamma\tau$ onto $Y$ of a vector field $\tau$ on $X$ by means of the composite connection $\gamma$ coincides with the composition $A_\Sigma(\Gamma\tau)$ of horizontal lifts of $\tau$ onto $\Sigma$ by means of a connection $\Gamma$ and then onto $Y$ by means of a connection $A_\Sigma$.

== Vertical covariant differential ==
Given the composite bundle $Y$ (1), there is the following exact sequence of vector bundles over $Y$:

$$0\to V_\Sigma Y\to VY\to Y\times_\Sigma V\Sigma\to 0, \qquad\qquad (2)$$

where $V_\Sigma Y$ and $V_\Sigma^*Y$ are the vertical tangent bundle and the vertical cotangent bundle of $Y\to\Sigma$. Every connection $A_\Sigma$ on a fiber bundle $Y\to\Sigma$ yields the splitting

$$A_\Sigma: TY\supset VY \ni \dot y^i\partial_i + \dot\sigma^m\partial_m \to (\dot
y^i -A^i_m\dot\sigma^m)\partial_i$$

of the exact sequence (2). Using this splitting, one can construct a first order differential operator

$$\widetilde D: J^1Y\to T^*X\otimes_Y V_\Sigma Y, \qquad \widetilde D= dx^\lambda\otimes(y^i_\lambda- A^i_\lambda -A^i_m\sigma^m_\lambda)\partial_i,$$

on a composite bundle $Y\to X$. It is called the vertical covariant differential. It possesses the following important property.

Let $h$ be a section of a fiber bundle $\Sigma\to X$, and let $h^*Y\subset Y$ be the pullback bundle over $X$. Every connection $A_\Sigma$ induces the pullback connection

$$A_h=dx^\lambda\otimes[\partial_\lambda+((A^i_m\circ h)\partial_\lambda h^m
+(A\circ h)^i_\lambda)\partial_i]$$

on $h^*Y$. Then the restriction of a vertical covariant differential $\widetilde D$ to $J^1h^*Y\subset J^1Y$ coincides with the familiar covariant differential $D^{A_h}$ on $h^*Y$ relative to the pullback connection $A_h$.

== See also ==
- Connection (mathematics)
- Connection (fibred manifold)
