= World manifold =

Application of topology

In gravitation theory, a world manifold endowed with some Lorentzian pseudo-Riemannian metric and an associated space-time structure is a space-time. Gravitation theory is formulated as classical field theory on natural bundles over a world manifold.

== Topology ==
A world manifold is a four-dimensional orientable real smooth manifold. It is assumed to be a Hausdorff and second countable topological space. Consequently, it is a locally compact space which is a union of a countable number of compact subsets, a separable space, a paracompact and completely regular space. Being paracompact, a world manifold admits a partition of unity by smooth functions. Paracompactness is an essential characteristic of a world manifold. It is necessary and sufficient in order that a world manifold admits a Riemannian metric and necessary for the existence of a pseudo-Riemannian metric. A world manifold is assumed to be connected and, consequently, it is arcwise connected.

== Riemannian structure ==
The tangent bundle $TX$ of a world manifold $X$ and the associated principal frame bundle $FX$ of linear tangent frames in $TX$ possess a general linear group structure group $GL^+(4,\mathbb R)$. A world manifold $X$ is said to be parallelizable if the tangent bundle $TX$ and, accordingly, the frame bundle $FX$ are trivial, i.e., there exists a global section (a frame field) of $FX$. It is essential that the tangent and associated bundles over a world manifold admit a bundle atlas of finite number of trivialization charts.

Tangent and frame bundles over a world manifold are natural bundles characterized by general covariant transformations. These transformations are gauge symmetries of gravitation theory on a world manifold.

By virtue of the well-known theorem on structure group reduction, a structure group $GL^+(4,\mathbb R)$ of a frame bundle $FX$ over a world manifold $X$ is always reducible to its maximal compact subgroup $SO(4)$. The corresponding global section of the quotient bundle $FX/SO(4)$ is a Riemannian metric $g^R$ on $X$. Thus, a world manifold always admits a Riemannian metric which makes $X$ a metric topological space.

== Lorentzian structure ==
In accordance with the geometric Equivalence Principle, a world manifold possesses a Lorentzian structure, i.e., a structure group of a frame bundle $FX$ must be reduced to a Lorentz group $SO(1,3)$. The corresponding global section of the quotient bundle $FX/SO(1,3)$ is a pseudo-Riemannian metric $g$ of signature $(+,---)$ on $X$. It is treated as a gravitational field in General Relativity and as a classical Higgs field in gauge gravitation theory.

A Lorentzian structure need not exist. Therefore, a world manifold is assumed to satisfy a certain topological condition. It is either a noncompact topological space or a compact space with a zero Euler characteristic. Usually, one also requires that a world manifold admits a spinor structure in order to describe Dirac fermion fields in gravitation theory. There is the additional topological obstruction to the existence of this structure. In particular, a noncompact world manifold must be parallelizable.

== Space-time structure ==
If a structure group of a frame bundle $FX$ is reducible to a Lorentz group, the latter is always reducible to its maximal compact subgroup $SO(3)$. Thus, there is the commutative diagram

$$GL(4,\mathbb R) \to  SO(4)$$
$$\downarrow \qquad \qquad \qquad \quad \downarrow$$
$$SO(1,3) \to SO(3)$$

of the reduction of structure groups of a frame bundle $FX$ in gravitation theory. This reduction diagram results in the following.

(i) In gravitation theory on a world manifold $X$, one can always choose an atlas of a frame bundle $FX$ (characterized by local frame fields $\{h^\lambda\}$) with $SO(3)$-valued transition functions. These transition functions preserve a time-like component $h_0=h^\mu_0 \partial_\mu$ of local frame fields which, therefore, is globally defined. It is a nowhere vanishing vector field on $X$. Accordingly, the dual time-like covector field $h^0=h^0_\lambda dx^\lambda$ also is globally defined, and it yields a spatial distribution $\mathfrak F\subset TX$ on $X$ such that $h^0\rfloor \mathfrak F=0$. Then the tangent bundle $TX$ of a world manifold $X$ admits a space-time decomposition $TX=\mathfrak F\oplus T^0X$, where $T^0X$ is a one-dimensional fibre bundle spanned by a time-like vector field $h_0$. This decomposition, is called the $g$-compatible space-time structure. It makes a world manifold the space-time.

(ii) Given the above-mentioned diagram of reduction of structure groups, let $g$ and $g^R$ be the corresponding pseudo-Riemannian and Riemannian metrics on $X$. They form a triple $(g,g^R,h^0)$ obeying the relation

$$g=2h^0\otimes h^0 -g^R$$.

Conversely, let a world manifold $X$ admit a nowhere vanishing one-form $\sigma$ (or, equivalently, a nowhere vanishing vector field). Then any Riemannian metric $g^R$ on $X$ yields the pseudo-Riemannian metric

$$g=\frac{2}{g^R(\sigma,\sigma)}\sigma\otimes \sigma -g^R$$.

It follows that a world manifold $X$ admits a pseudo-Riemannian metric if and only if there exists a nowhere vanishing vector (or covector) field on $X$.

Let us note that a $g$-compatible Riemannian metric $g^R$ in a triple $(g,g^R,h^0)$ defines a $g$-compatible distance function on a world manifold $X$. Such a function brings $X$ into a metric space whose locally Euclidean topology is equivalent to a manifold topology on $X$. Given a gravitational field $g$, the $g$-compatible Riemannian metrics and the corresponding distance functions are different for different spatial distributions $\mathfrak F$ and $\mathfrak F'$. It follows that physical observers associated with these different spatial distributions perceive a world manifold $X$ as different Riemannian spaces. The well-known relativistic changes of sizes of moving bodies exemplify this phenomenon.

However, one attempts to derive a world topology directly from a space-time structure (a path topology, an Alexandrov topology). If a space-time satisfies the strong causality condition, such topologies coincide with a familiar manifold topology of a world manifold. In a general case, they however are rather extraordinary.

== Causality conditions ==
A space-time structure is called integrable if a spatial distribution $\mathfrak F$ is involutive. In this case, its integral manifolds constitute a spatial foliation of a world manifold whose leaves are spatial three-dimensional subspaces. A spatial foliation is called causal if no curve transversal to its leaves intersects each leave more than once. This condition is equivalent to the stable causality of Stephen Hawking. A space-time foliation is causal if and only if it is a foliation of level surfaces of some smooth real function on $X$ whose differential nowhere vanishes. Such a foliation is a fibred manifold $X\to \mathbb R$. However, this is not the case of a compact world manifold which can not be a fibred manifold over $\mathbb R$.

The stable causality does not provide the simplest causal structure. If a fibred manifold $X\to\mathbb R$ is a fibre bundle, it is trivial, i.e., a world manifold $X$ is a globally hyperbolic manifold $X=\mathbb R \times M$. Since any oriented three-dimensional manifold is parallelizable, a globally hyperbolic world manifold is parallelizable.

== See also ==
- Spacetime
- Mathematics of general relativity
- Gauge gravitation theory
