= Covariant classical field theory =

Classical field theories on fiber bundles

In mathematical physics, covariant classical field theory represents classical fields by sections of fiber bundles, and their dynamics is phrased in the context of a finite-dimensional space of fields. Nowadays, it is well known that jet bundles and the variational bicomplex are the correct domain for such a description. The Hamiltonian variant of covariant classical field theory is the covariant Hamiltonian field theory where momenta correspond to derivatives of field variables with respect to all world coordinates. Non-autonomous mechanics is formulated as covariant classical field theory on fiber bundles over the time axis $\mathbb{R}$.

== Examples ==
Many important examples of classical field theories which are of interest in quantum field theory are given below. In particular, these are the theories which make up the Standard Model of particle physics. These examples will be used in the discussion of the general mathematical formulation of classical field theory.

=== Uncoupled theories ===
- Scalar field theory
  - Klein−Gordon theory
- Spinor theories
  - Dirac theory
  - Weyl theory
  - Majorana theory
- Gauge theories
  - Maxwell theory
  - Yang–Mills theory. This is the only theory in the uncoupled theory list which contains interactions: Yang–Mills contains self-interactions.

=== Coupled theories ===
- Yukawa coupling: coupling of scalar and spinor fields.
- Scalar electrodynamics/chromodynamics: coupling of scalar and gauge fields.
- Quantum electrodynamics/chromodynamics: coupling of spinor and gauge fields. Despite these being named quantum theories, the Lagrangians can be considered as those of a classical field theory.

== Requisite mathematical structures ==
In order to formulate a classical field theory, the following structures are needed:

=== Spacetime ===
A smooth manifold $M$.

This is variously known as the world manifold (for emphasizing the manifold without additional structures such as a metric), spacetime (when equipped with a Lorentzian metric), or the base manifold for a more geometrical viewpoint.

==== Structures on spacetime ====
The spacetime often comes with additional structure. Examples are

- Metric: a (pseudo-)Riemannian metric $\mathbf{g}$ on $M$.
- Metric up to conformal equivalence

as well as the required structure of an orientation, needed for a notion of integration over all of the manifold $M$.

==== Symmetries of spacetime ====
The spacetime $M$ may admit symmetries. For example, if it is equipped with a metric $\mathbf{g}$, these are the isometries of $M$, generated by the Killing vector fields. The symmetries form a group $\text{Aut}(M)$, the automorphisms of spacetime. In this case the fields of the theory should transform in a representation of $\text{Aut}(M)$.

For example, for Minkowski space, the symmetries are the Poincaré group $\text{Iso}(1,3)$.

=== Gauge, principal bundles and connections ===
A Lie group $G$ describing the (continuous) symmetries of internal degrees of freedom. This is referred to as the gauge group. The corresponding Lie algebra through the Lie group–Lie algebra correspondence is denoted $\mathfrak{g}$.

A principal $G$-bundle $P$, otherwise known as a $G$-torsor. This is sometimes written as

$$P\xrightarrow{\pi}M$$

where $\pi$ is the canonical projection map on $P$ and $M$ is the base manifold.

==== Connections and gauge fields ====
Here we take the view of the connection as a principal connection. In field theory this connection is also viewed as a covariant derivative $\nabla$ whose action on various fields is defined later.

A principal connection denoted $\mathcal{A}$ is a $\mathfrak{g}$-valued 1-form on P satisfying technical conditions of 'projection' and 'right-equivariance': details found in the principal connection article.

Under a trivialization this can be written as a local gauge field $A_\mu(x)$, a $\mathfrak{g}$-valued 1-form on a trivialization patch $U\subset M$. It is this local form of the connection which is identified with gauge fields in physics. When the base manifold $M$ is flat, there are simplifications which remove this subtlety.

=== Associated vector bundles and matter content ===
An associated vector bundle $E\xrightarrow{\pi}M$ associated to the principal bundle $P$ through a representation $\rho.$

For completeness, given a representation $(V,G,\rho)$, the fiber of $E$ is $V$.

A field or matter field is a section of an associated vector bundle. The collection of these, together with gauge fields, is the matter content of the theory.

=== Lagrangian ===
A Lagrangian $L$: given a fiber bundle $E'\xrightarrow{\pi}M$, the Lagrangian is a function $L:E'\rightarrow \mathbb{R}$.

Suppose that the matter content is given by sections of $E$ with fibre $V$ from above. Then for example, more concretely we may consider $E'$ to be a bundle where the fibre at $p$ is $V\otimes T_p^*M$. This then allows $L$ to be viewed as a functional of a field.

This completes the mathematical prerequisites for a large number of interesting theories, including those given in the examples section above.

== Theories on flat spacetime ==
When the base manifold $M$ is flat, that is, (Pseudo-)Euclidean space, there are many useful simplifications that make theories less conceptually difficult to deal with.

The simplifications come from the observation that flat spacetime is contractible: it is then a theorem in algebraic topology that any fibre bundle over flat $M$ is trivial.

In particular, this allows us to pick a global trivialization of $P$, and therefore identify the connection globally as a gauge field $A_\mu.$

Furthermore, there is a trivial connection $A_{0,\mu}$ which allows us to identify associated vector bundles as $E = M\times V$, and then we need not view fields as sections but simply as functions $M\rightarrow V$. In other words, vector bundles at different points are comparable. In addition, for flat spacetime the Levi-Civita connection is the trivial connection on the frame bundle.

Then the spacetime covariant derivative on tensor or spin-tensor fields is simply the partial derivative in flat coordinates. However the gauge covariant derivative may require a non-trivial connection $A_\mu$ which is considered to be the gauge field of the theory.

=== Accuracy as a physical model ===
In weak gravitational curvature, flat spacetime often serves as a good approximation to weakly curved spacetime. For experiment, this approximation is good. The Standard Model is defined on flat spacetime, and has produced the most accurate precision tests of physics to date.

== See also ==
- Classical field theory
- Exterior algebra
- Lagrangian system
- Variational bicomplex
- Quantum field theory
- Non-autonomous mechanics
- Higgs field (classical)
