= Dmitri Ivanenko =

Ukrainian physicist (1904–1994)

- Born: 29 July 1904; Poltava, Russian Empire (present-day Ukraine)
- Died: December 30, 1994 (aged 90); Moscow, Russia
- Citizenship: USSR
- Education: Leningrad State University
- Known for: Ivanenko–Landau–Kähler equation Nuclear shell model Proton–neutron model of the nucleus Quantum spacetime Quark star Synchrotron radiation
- Scientific career
- Fields: Theoretical physics Nuclear physics Field theory Gravitation
- Workplaces: Moscow State University
- Doctoral students: Arseny Sokolov; Gennadi Sardanashvily

Dmitri Dmitrievich Ivanenko (Ukrainian: Дмитро́ Дми́трович Іване́нко, Russian: Дми́трий Дми́триевич Иване́нко; July 29, 1904 – December 30, 1994) was a Soviet theoretical physicist of Ukrainian origin who made great contributions to the physical science of the twentieth century, especially to nuclear physics, field theory, and gravitation theory. He worked in the Poltava Gravimetric Observatory of the Institute of Geophysics of NAS of Ukraine, was the head of the Theoretical Department Ukrainian Physico-Technical Institute in Kharkiv, Head of the Department of Theoretical Physics of the Kharkiv Institute of Mechanical Engineering. Professor of University of Kharkiv, Professor of Moscow State University (since 1943).

== Biography ==
Dmitri Ivanenko was born on July 29, 1904, in Poltava (present-day Ukraine), where he finished school, in 1920–1923 he studied at the Poltava Pedagogical Institute and began his creative path as a teacher of physics in middle school. Then Ivanenko studied at Kharkiv University, from which in 1923 he was transferred to Petrograd University. In 1926, while still a student, he wrote his first scientific works: with George Gamow on the Kaluza–Klein five-dimensional theory and with Lev Landau on the problems of relativistic quantum mechanics.

After graduating from the university, from 1927 to 1930 Ivanenko was a scholarship student and then a research scientist at the Physical Mathematical Institute of Academy of Sciences of the USSR. During these years he collaborated with Lev Landau, Vladimir Fock and Viktor Ambartsumian, later becoming famous. This was when modern physics, the new quantum mechanics, and nuclear physics were established.

In 1928, Ivanenko and Landau developed the theory of fermions as skew-symmetric tensors. This theory, known as the Ivanenko-Landau-Kahler theory, is not equivalent to Dirac's one in the presence of a gravitation field, and only it describes fermions on a lattice.

In 1929, Ivanenko and Fock described the parallel displacement of spinors in curved space-time (the famous Ivanenko–Fock coefficients). Nobel laureate Abdus Salam called it the first gauge field theory.

In 1930, Ambartsumian and Ivanenko suggested the hypothesis of creation of massive particles which is a cornerstone of contemporary quantum field theory.

From 1929 to 1931 Ivanenko worked at the Ukrainian Physico-Technical Institute in Kharkiv, being the first director of its theoretical division. Ivanenko was one of organizers of the first Soviet theoretical conference (1929) and the new journal Physikalische Zeitschrift der Sowjetunion.

After returning to Leningrad at the Physical-Technical Institute, Ivanenko concentrated his interest to nuclear physics. In 1932 Ivanenko proposed the proton-neutron model of the atomic nucleus, in connection with which the name Ivanenko entered physics textbooks, including school textbooks. Later Ivanenko and E. Gapon proposed the idea of the shell distribution of protons and neutrons in the nucleus (nuclear shell model). In 1933 on the initiative of Ivanenko and I. Kurchatov the first Soviet nuclear conference was called.

In 1934 Ivanenko and I. Tamm laid the basis of the first non-phenomenological theory of paired electron-neutron nuclear forces. They made the significant assumption that interaction can be undergone by exchange of particles with a rest mass not equal to zero. Based on their model, Nobel laureate Hideki Yukawa developed his meson theory.

The realization of Ivanenko's far-reaching plans and hopes was interrupted, however. In 1935 he was arrested in connection with the Kirov affair. Exile to Tomsk followed, where he was a professor at Tomsk University from 1936 to 1938. Until the beginning of World War II, he managed the theoretical-physics personnel at Sverdlovsk University and Kiev University. In 1940 he defended his doctoral dissertation. In this period, Ivanenko's scientific interest gradually shifted from nuclear physics to cosmic ray theory. In particular, he proposed a non-linear generalization of Dirac's equation (1938). Based on this generalization, Heisenberg and Ivanenko developed the unified nonlinear field theory in the 1950s.

From 1943 and until the last days of his life, Professor Ivanenko was closely associated with the physics faculty of M. V. Lomonosov Moscow State University.

In 1943, Ivanenko and I. Pomeranchuk predicted the phenomenon of synchrotron radiation given off by relativistic electrons in magnetic fields. This radiation was soon discovered by American experimenters. The discovery of synchrotron radiation opened a new and important chapter in modern physics as a result of its special properties and possible applications. Classical and quantum theory of synchrotron radiation was developed in research performed by students and followers of Ivanenko: A. A. Sokolov, I. M. Ternov et al. For their work in this area D. D. Ivanenko and A. A. Sokolov were awarded the Stalin Prize in 1950. Two of Ivanenko's and Sokolov's monographs Classical Field Theory and Quantum Field Theory were published at the beginning of the 1950s.

The theme of Professor Ivanenko's postwar work was mesodynamics, theory of hypernucleus, the unified non-linear spinor field theory, gravitation theory.

In the 1960s, Ivanenko did intensive scientific, scientific-methodological, and organizational work on the development and coordination of gravitation research in USSR. In 1961, on his initiative the first Soviet gravitation conference, which initiated a series of Soviet, and later also Russian, gravitation conferences was organized. At the beginning of the 1960s Ivanenko was the organizer of the gravitation section of Ministry of Higher Institutes of Learning of the USSR, which lasted until the 1980s. He was a member of the International Gravitation Committee since its founding in 1959.

Theoretical physics has been enormously influenced by the seminar on theoretical physics organized by Ivanenko in 1944 that continued to meet for 50 years under his guidance at the Physics Department of Moscow State University. The distinguishing characteristic of Ivanenko's seminar was the breadth of its grasp of the problems of theoretical physics and its discussion of the links between its various divisions, for example, gravitation theory and elementary particle physics. The most prominent physicists in the world participated in the seminar: Niels Bohr, Paul Dirac, Hideki Yukawa, Julian Schwinger, Abdus Salam, Aage Bohr, Ilya Prigogine, John Archibald Wheeler et al.

In the 1970–80s, Ivanenko was concentrated on gravitation theory. His scientific team mainly developed different generalizations of Einstein's general relativity, including scalar-tensor gravitation theory, the hypothesis of quark stars, gravity with torsion, gauge gravitation theory and others. In 1985, Ivanenko and his collaborators published two monographs Gravitation and Gauge Gravitation Theory.

The scientific style of Ivanenko was characterized by great interest in ideas of frontiers in science where these ideas were based on strong mathematical methods or experiment.

Ivanenko died on December 30, 1994, at the age of 90. His sister, Oksana Ivanenko, was a children's writer and translator.

== Scientific contributions ==
His outstanding achievements include:

- the Fock–Ivanenko coefficients of parallel displacement of spinors in a curved space-time (1929)
- the Ambartsumian–Ivanenko hypothesis of creation of massive particles (1930)
- the proton–neutron model of atomic nuclei (1932)
- the first shell model of nuclei (1932, in collaboration with E. Gapon)
- the first model of exchange nuclear forces (1934, in collaboration with Igor Tamm)
- the prediction of synchrotron radiation (1944, in collaboration with I. Pomeranchuk)
- the theory of hypernuclei (1956)
- the hypothesis of quark stars (1965, in collaboration with D. Kurdgelaidze)
- the gauge gravitation theory (1983, in collaboration with G. Sardanashvily)

Dmitri Ivanenko published more than 300 scientific works including 6 monographs and 11 volumes edited.
