= General covariant transformations =

Symmetries in a gravitational theory

In physics, general covariant transformations are symmetries of gravitation theory on a world manifold $X$. They are gauge transformations whose parameter functions are vector fields on $X$. From the physical viewpoint, general covariant transformations are treated as particular (holonomic) reference frame transformations in general relativity. In mathematics, general covariant transformations are defined as particular automorphisms of so-called natural fiber bundles.

== Mathematical definition ==
Let $\pi:Y\to X$ be a fibered manifold with local fibered coordinates $(x^\lambda, y^i)\,$. Every automorphism of $Y$ is projected onto a diffeomorphism of its base $X$. However, the converse is not true. A diffeomorphism of $X$ need not give rise to an automorphism of $Y$.

In particular, an infinitesimal generator of a one-parameter Lie group of automorphisms of $Y$ is a projectable vector field

$$u=u^\lambda(x^\mu)\partial_\lambda + u^i(x^\mu,y^j)\partial_i$$

on $Y$. This vector field is projected onto a vector field $\tau=u^\lambda\partial_\lambda$ on $X$, whose flow is a one-parameter group of diffeomorphisms of $X$. Conversely, let $\tau=\tau^\lambda\partial_\lambda$ be a vector field on $X$. There is a problem of constructing its lift to a projectable vector field on $Y$ projected onto $\tau$. Such a lift always exists, but it need not be canonical. Given a connection $\Gamma$ on $Y$, every vector field $\tau$ on $X$ gives rise to the horizontal vector field

$$\Gamma\tau =\tau^\lambda(\partial_\lambda +\Gamma_\lambda^i\partial_i)$$

on $Y$. This horizontal lift $\tau\to\Gamma\tau$ yields a monomorphism of the $C^\infty(X)$-module of vector fields on $X$ to the $C^\infty(Y)$-module of vector fields on $Y$, but this monomorphisms is not a Lie algebra morphism, unless $\Gamma$ is flat.

However, there is a category of above mentioned natural bundles $T\to X$ which admit the functorial lift $\widetilde\tau$ onto $T$ of any vector field $\tau$ on $X$ such that $\tau\to\widetilde\tau$ is a Lie algebra monomorphism

$$[\widetilde \tau,\widetilde \tau']=\widetilde {[\tau,\tau']}.$$

This functorial lift $\widetilde\tau$ is an infinitesimal general covariant transformation of $T$.

In a general setting, one considers a monomorphism $f\to\widetilde f$ of a group of diffeomorphisms of $X$ to a group of bundle automorphisms of a natural bundle $T\to X$. Automorphisms $\widetilde f$ are called the general covariant transformations of $T$. For instance, no vertical automorphism of $T$ is a general covariant transformation.

Natural bundles are exemplified by tensor bundles. For instance, the tangent bundle $TX$ of $X$ is a natural bundle. Every diffeomorphism $f$ of $X$ gives rise to the tangent automorphism $\widetilde f=Tf$ of $TX$ which is a general covariant transformation of $TX$. With respect to the holonomic coordinates $(x^\lambda, \dot x^\lambda)$ on $TX$, this transformation reads

$$\dot x'^\mu=\frac{\partial x'^\mu}{\partial x^\nu}\dot x^\nu.$$

A frame bundle $FX$ of linear tangent frames in $TX$ also is a natural bundle. General covariant transformations constitute a subgroup of holonomic automorphisms of $FX$. All bundles associated with a frame bundle are natural. However, there are natural bundles which are not associated with $FX$.

== See also ==
- General covariance
- Gauge gravitation theory
- Fibered manifold
