= Noether's second theorem =

Physics theorem for symmetries of action

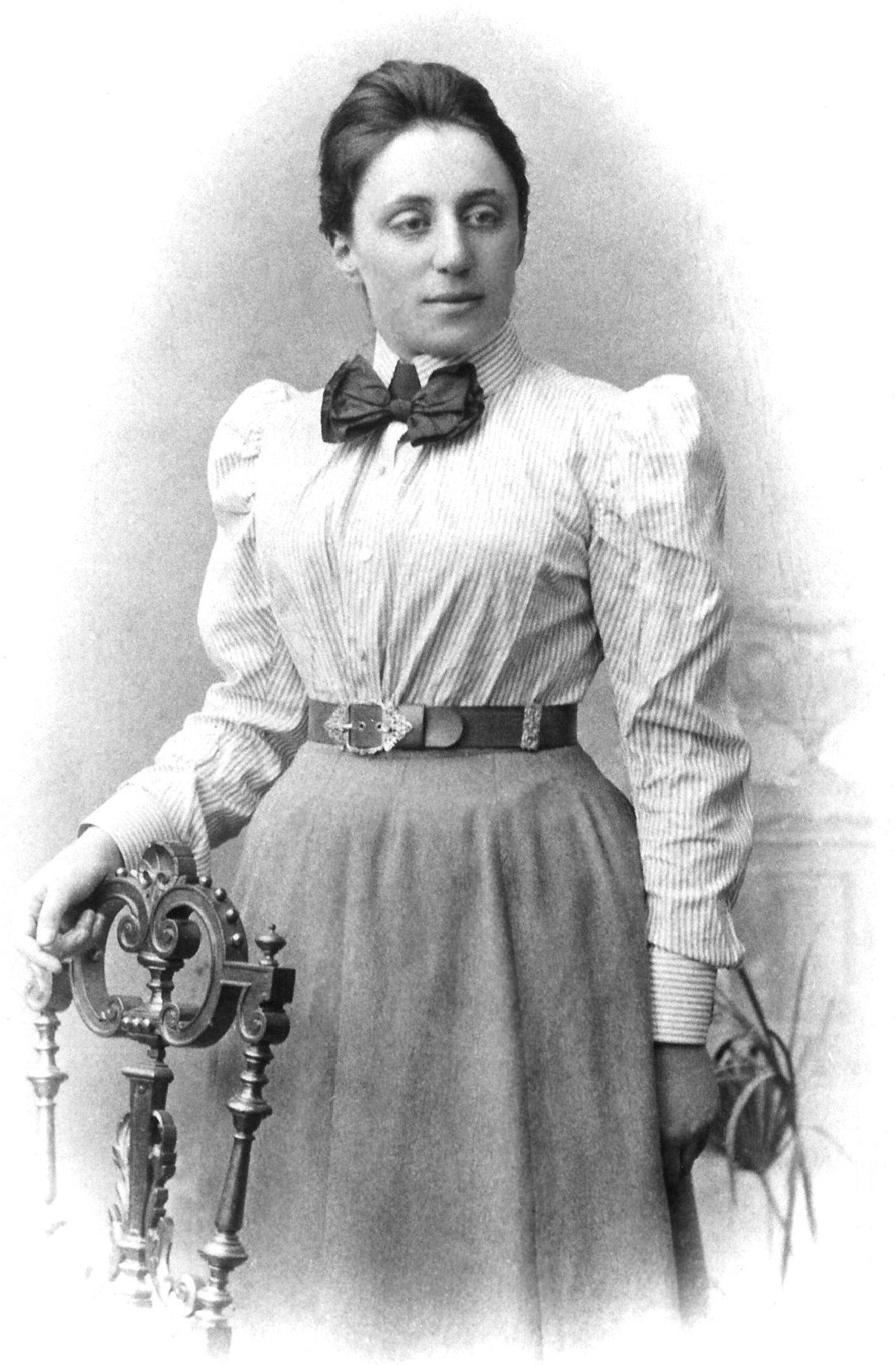
Portrait of Emmy Noether, around 1900.

In mathematics and theoretical physics, Noether's second theorem relates symmetries of an action functional with a system of differential equations. The theorem is named after its discoverer, Emmy Noether.

The action S of a physical system is an integral of a so-called Lagrangian function L, from which the system's behavior can be determined by the principle of least action. Specifically, the theorem says that if the action has an infinite-dimensional Lie algebra of infinitesimal symmetries parameterized linearly by k arbitrary functions and their derivatives up to order m, then the functional derivatives of L satisfy a system of k differential equations.

Noether's second theorem is sometimes used in gauge theory. Gauge theories are the basic elements of all modern field theories of physics, such as the prevailing Standard Model.

== Mathematical formulation ==
=== First variation formula ===
Suppose that we have a dynamical system specified in terms of $m$ independent variables $x=(x^1,\dots,x^m )$, $n$ dependent variables $u=(u^1,\dots, u^n )$, and a Lagrangian function $L(x,u,u_{(1)}\dots,u_{(r)})$ of some finite order $r$. Here $u_{(k)}=(u^\sigma_{i_1...i_k})=(d_{i_1}\dots d_{i_k}u^\sigma)$ is the collection of all $k$th order partial derivatives of the dependent variables. As a general rule, Latin indices $i,j,k,\dots$ from the middle of the alphabet take the values $1,\dots,m$, Greek indices take the values $1,\dots,n$, and the summation convention apply to them. Multiindex notation for the Latin indices is also introduced as follows. A multiindex $I$ of length $k$ is an ordered list $I=(i_1,\dots,i_k )$ of $k$ ordinary indices. The length is denoted as $\left|I \right|=k$. The summation convention does not directly apply to multiindices since the summation over lengths needs to be displayed explicitly, e.g.
$$\sum_{|I|=0}^r f_I g^I = fg + f_i g^i + f_{ij} g^{ij} + \dots + f_{i_1...i_r} g^{i_1...i_r}.$$
The variation of the Lagrangian with respect to an arbitrary variation $\delta u^\sigma$ of the dependent variables is
$$\delta L = \frac{\partial L}{\partial u^\sigma} \delta u^\sigma + \frac{\partial L}{\partial u^\sigma_i}\delta u ^\sigma_i
+ \dots + \frac{\partial L}{\partial u^\sigma_{i_1...i_r}} \delta u^\sigma_{i_1...i_r}
= \sum_{|I|=0}^r \frac{\partial L}{\partial u^\sigma_I}\delta u^\sigma_I,$$
and applying the inverse product rule of differentiation we get
$$\delta L = E_\sigma \delta u^\sigma + d_i\left(\sum_{|I|=0}^{r-1} P^{iI}_\sigma
\delta u^\sigma_I\right),$$
where
$$E_\sigma=\frac{\partial L}{\partial u^\sigma} - d_i \frac{\partial L}{\partial u^\sigma_i} +\dots
+ (-1)^r d_{i_1}\dots d_{i_r} \frac{\partial L}{\partial u^\sigma_{i_1...i_r}}
= \sum_{|I|=0}^r (-1)^{|I|}d_I \frac{\partial L}{\partial u^\sigma_I}$$
are the Euler–Lagrange expressions of the Lagrangian, and the coefficients $P^I_\sigma$ (Lagrangian momenta) are given by
$$P^I_\sigma = \sum_{|J|=0}^{r-|I|}(-1)^{|J|}d_J\frac{\partial L}{\partial u^\sigma_{IJ}}.$$

=== Variational symmetries ===
A variation $\delta u^\sigma = X^\sigma(x,u,u_{(1)},\dots)$ is an infinitesimal symmetry of the Lagrangian $L$ if $\delta L = 0$ under this variation. It is an infinitesimal quasi-symmetry if there is a current $K^i=K^i(x,u,\dots)$ such that $\delta L = d_i K^i$.

It should be remarked that it is possible to extend infinitesimal (quasi-)symmetries by including variations with $\delta x^i \neq 0$ as well, i.e. the independent variables are also varied. However such symmetries can always be rewritten so that they act only on the dependent variables. Therefore, in the sequel we restrict to so-called vertical variations where $\delta x^i = 0$.

For Noether's second theorem, we consider those variational symmetries (called gauge symmetries) which are parametrized linearly by a set of arbitrary functions and their derivatives. These variations have the generic form
$$\delta_\lambda u^\sigma = R^\sigma_a \lambda^a + R^{\sigma,i}_{a}\lambda^a_{i} + \dots + R^{\sigma,i_1...i_s}_a \lambda^a_{i_1...i_s}
= \sum_{|I|=0}^s R^{\sigma,I}_a \lambda^a_I,$$
where the coefficients $R^{\sigma,I}_a$ can depend on the independent and dependent variables as well as the derivatives of the latter up to some finite order, the $\lambda^a = \lambda^a (x)$ are arbitrarily specifiable functions of the independent variables, and the Latin indices $a,b,\dots$ take the values $1,\dots,q$, where $q$ is some positive integer.

For these variations to be (exact, i.e. not quasi-) gauge symmetries of the Lagrangian, it is necessary that $\delta_\lambda L = 0$ for all possible choices of the functions $\lambda^a (x)$. If the variations are quasi-symmetries, it is then necessary that the current also depends linearly and differentially on the arbitrary functions, i.e. then $\delta_\lambda L =d_i K^i_\lambda$, where
$$K^i_\lambda = K^i_a \lambda^a + K^{i,j}_a \lambda^a_{j} + K^{i,j_1j_2}_a \lambda^a_{j_1j_2}\dots$$
For simplicity, we will assume that all gauge symmetries are exact symmetries, but the general case is handled similarly.

=== Noether's second theorem ===
The statement of Noether's second theorem is that whenever given a Lagrangian $L$ as above that admits gauge symmetries $\delta_\lambda u^\sigma$ parametrized linearly by $q$ arbitrary functions and their derivatives, then there exist $q$ linear differential relations between the Euler–Lagrange equations of $L$.

Combining the first variation formula together with the fact that the variations $\delta_\lambda u^\sigma$ are symmetries, we get
$$0 = E_\sigma \delta_\lambda u^\sigma + d_i W^i_\lambda,\quad
W^i_\lambda = \sum_{|I|=0}^r P^{iI}_\sigma  \delta_\lambda u^\sigma,$$
where on the first term proportional to the Euler–Lagrange expressions, further integrations by parts can be performed as
$$E_\sigma \delta_\lambda u^\sigma = \sum_{|I|=0}^s E_\sigma R^{\sigma, I}_a \lambda^a_I
= Q_a\lambda^a + d_i\left(\sum_{|I|=0}^{s-1} Q^{iI}_a \lambda^a_I \right),$$
where
$$Q^I_a = \sum_{|J|=0}^{s-|I|}(-1)^{|J|}d_J\left( E_\sigma R^{\sigma,IJ}_a \right),$$
in particular for $|I| = 0$,
$$Q_a = E_\sigma R^\sigma_a - d_i\left( E_\sigma R^{\sigma,i}_a\right)+\dots +
(-1)^s d_{i_1}\dots d_{i_s}\left( E_\sigma R^{\sigma,i_1...i_s}_a \right)
= \sum_{|I|=0}^s (-1)^{|I|} d_I\left(E_\sigma R^{\sigma,I}_a\right) .$$
Hence, we have an off-shell relation
$$0 = Q_a\lambda^a + d_i S^i_\lambda,$$
where $S^i_\lambda = H^i_\lambda + W^i_\lambda,$ with $H^i_\lambda = \sum_{|I|=0}^{s-1} Q^{iI}_a\lambda^a_I$. This relation is valid for any choice of the gauge parameters $\lambda^a (x)$. Choosing them to be compactly supported, and integrating the relation over the manifold of independent variables, the integral total divergence terms vanishes due to Stokes' theorem. Then from the fundamental lemma of the calculus of variations, we obtain that $Q_a\equiv 0$ identically as off-shell relations (in fact, since the $Q_a$ are linear in the Euler–Lagrange expressions, they necessarily vanish on-shell). Inserting this back into the initial equation, we also obtain the off-shell conservation law $d_i S^i_\lambda = 0$.

The expressions $Q_a$ are differential in the Euler–Lagrange expressions, specifically we have
$$Q_a = \mathcal D_a[E] = \sum_{|I|=0}^s (-1)^{|I|} d_I\left(E_\sigma R^{\sigma,I}_a\right)
= \sum_{|I|=0}^s F^{\sigma, I}_a d_I E_\sigma,$$
where
$$F^{\sigma,I}_a = \sum_{|J|=0}^{s-|I|} \binom{|I|+|J|}{|I|} (-1)^{|I|+|J|} d_J R^{\sigma,IJ}_a.$$
Hence, the equations
$$0 = \mathcal{D}_a[E]$$
are $q$ differential relations to which the Euler–Lagrange expressions are subject to, and therefore the Euler–Lagrange equations of the system are not independent.

=== Converse result ===
A converse of the second Noether theorem can also be established. Specifically, suppose that the Euler–Lagrange expressions $E_\sigma$ of the system are subject to $q$ differential relations
$$0 = \mathcal D_a[E] = \sum_{|I|=0}^s F^{\sigma,I}_a d_I E_\sigma.$$
Letting $\lambda = (\lambda^1,\dots,\lambda^q )$ be an arbitrary $q$-tuple of functions, the formal adjoint of the operator $\mathcal{D}_a$ acts on these functions through the formula
$$E_\sigma (\mathcal{D}^+)^\sigma[\lambda] - \lambda^a\mathcal{D}_a [E] = d_i B^i_\lambda,$$
which defines the adjoint operator $(\mathcal{D}^+)^\sigma$ uniquely. The coefficients of the adjoint operator are obtained through integration by parts as before, specifically
$$(\mathcal{D}^+)^\sigma [\lambda] = \sum_{|I|=0}^s R^{\sigma,I}_a \lambda^a_I,$$
where
$$R^{\sigma,I}_a = \sum_{|J|=0}^{s-|I|} (-1)^{|I|+|J|} \binom{|I|+|J|}{|I|} d_J F^{\sigma,IJ}_a.$$
Then the definition of the adjoint operator together with the relations $0 = \mathcal{D}_a [E]$ state that for each $q$-tuple of functions $\lambda$, the value of the adjoint on the functions when contracted with the Euler–Lagrange expressions is a total divergence, viz. $E_\sigma(\mathcal{D}^+)^\sigma [\lambda] = d_i B^i_\lambda,$ therefore if we define the variations
$$\delta_\lambda u^\sigma := (\mathcal{D}^+)^\sigma[\lambda]=\sum_{|I|=0}^s R^{\sigma,I}_a\lambda^a_I,$$
the variation
$$\delta_\lambda L = E_\sigma \delta_\lambda u^\sigma + d_i W^i_\lambda
= d_i\left(B^i_\lambda + W^i_\lambda\right)$$
of the Lagrangian is a total divergence, hence the variations $\delta_\lambda u^\sigma$ are quasi-symmetries for every value of the functions $\lambda^a$.

== See also ==
- Noether's first theorem
- Noether identities
- Gauge symmetry (mathematics)
