= Higgs field (classical) =

Principal bundle formulation of the Higgs field

Spontaneous symmetry breaking, a vacuum Higgs field, and its associated fundamental particle the Higgs boson are quantum phenomena. A vacuum Higgs field is responsible for spontaneous symmetry breaking the gauge symmetries of fundamental interactions and provides the Higgs mechanism of generating mass of elementary particles.

At the same time, classical gauge theory admits comprehensive geometric formulation where gauge fields are represented by connections on principal bundles. In this framework, spontaneous symmetry breaking is characterized as a reduction of the structure group $G$ of a principal bundle $P\to X$ to its closed subgroup $H$. By the well-known theorem, such a reduction takes place if and only if there exists a global section $h$ of the quotient bundle $P/H\to X$. This section is treated as a classical Higgs field.

A key point is that there exists a composite bundle $P\to P/H\to X$ where $P\to P/H$ is a principal bundle with the structure group $H$. Then matter fields, possessing an exact symmetry group $H$, in the presence of classical Higgs fields are described by sections of some composite bundle $E\to P/H\to X$, where $E\to P/H$ is some associated bundle to $P\to P/H$. Herewith, a Lagrangian of these matter fields is gauge invariant only if it factorizes through the vertical covariant differential of some connection on a principal bundle $P\to P/H$, but not $P\to X$.

An example of a classical Higgs field is a classical gravitational field identified with a pseudo-Riemannian metric on a world manifold $X$. In the framework of gauge gravitation theory, it is described as a global section of the quotient bundle $FX/O(1,3)\to X$ where $FX$ is a principal bundle of the tangent frames to $X$ with the structure group $GL(4,\mathbb R)$.

== See also ==
- Gauge gravitation theory
- Reduction of the structure group
- Spontaneous symmetry breaking

== Bibliography ==
- Ivanenko, D.; Sardanashvily, G. (1983). "The gauge treatment of gravity". Phys. Rep. 94 (1): 1. Bibcode:1983PhR....94....1I. doi:10.1016/0370-1573(83)90046-7.
- Trautman, A. (1984). Differential Geometry for Physicists. Naples, IT: Bibliopolis.
- Nikolova, L.; Rizov, V. (1984). "Geometrical approach to the reduction of gauge theories with spontaneous broken symmetries". Rep. Math. Phys. 20: 287. doi:10.1016/0034-4877(84)90039-9.
- Keyl, M. (1991). "About the geometric structure of symmetry breaking". J. Math. Phys. 32 (4): 1065. Bibcode:1991JMP....32.1065K. doi:10.1063/1.529385.
- Giachetta, G.; Mangiarotti, L.; Sardanashvily, G. (2009). Advanced Classical Field Theory. World Scientific. ISBN 978-981-283-895-7.
