= Variational bicomplex =

Mathematical formulation of Lagrangian mechanics

In mathematics, the Lagrangian theory on fiber bundles is globally formulated in algebraic terms of the variational bicomplex, without appealing to the calculus of variations. For instance, this is the case of classical field theory on fiber bundles (covariant classical field theory).

The variational bicomplex is a cochain complex of the differential graded algebra of exterior forms on jet manifolds of sections of a fiber bundle. Lagrangians and Euler–Lagrange operators on a fiber bundle are defined as elements of this bicomplex. Cohomology of the variational bicomplex leads to the global first variational formula and first Noether's theorem.

Extended to Lagrangian theory of even and odd fields on graded manifolds, the variational bicomplex provides strict mathematical formulation of classical field theory in a general case of reducible degenerate Lagrangians and the Lagrangian BRST theory.

== See also ==
- Calculus of variations
- Lagrangian system
- Jet bundle
