= Lagrangian system =

Pair in mathematics

In mathematics, a Lagrangian system is a pair (Y, L), consisting of a smooth fiber bundle Y → X and a Lagrangian density L, which yields the Euler–Lagrange differential operator acting on sections of Y → X.

In classical mechanics, many dynamical systems are Lagrangian systems. The configuration space of such a Lagrangian system is a fiber bundle $Q \rarr \mathbb{R}$ over the time axis $\mathbb{R}$. In particular, $Q = \mathbb{R} \times M$ if a reference frame is fixed. In classical field theory, all field systems are the Lagrangian ones.

== Lagrangians and Euler–Lagrange operators ==
A Lagrangian density L (or, simply, a Lagrangian) of order r is defined as an n-form, n = dim X, on the r-order jet manifold J^{r}Y of Y.

A Lagrangian L can be introduced as an element of the variational bicomplex of the differential graded algebra O^{∗}_{∞}(Y) of exterior forms on jet manifolds of Y → X. The coboundary operator of this bicomplex contains the variational operator δ which, acting on L, defines the associated Euler–Lagrange operator δL.

=== In coordinates ===
Given bundle coordinates x^{λ}, y^{i} on a fiber bundle Y and the adapted coordinates x^{λ}, y^{i}, y^{i}_{Λ}, (Λ = (λ_{1}, ...,λ_{k}), |Λ| = k ≤ r) on jet manifolds J^{r}Y, a Lagrangian L and its Euler–Lagrange operator read:

$$L=\mathcal{L}(x^\lambda,y^i,y^i_\Lambda) \, d^nx,$$

$$\delta L= \delta_i\mathcal{L} \, dy^i\wedge d^nx,\qquad \delta_i\mathcal{L} =\partial_i\mathcal{L} +
\sum_{|\Lambda|}(-1)^{|\Lambda|} \, d_\Lambda
\, \partial_i^\Lambda\mathcal{L},$$

where

$$d_\Lambda=d_{\lambda_1}\cdots d_{\lambda_k}, \qquad
d_\lambda=\partial_\lambda + y^i_\lambda\partial_i +\cdots,$$

denote the total derivatives.

For instance, a first-order Lagrangian and its second-order Euler–Lagrange operator take the form

$$L=\mathcal{L}(x^\lambda,y^i,y^i_\lambda) \, d^nx,\qquad
\delta_i L =\partial_i\mathcal{L} - d_\lambda
\partial_i^\lambda\mathcal{L}.$$

=== Euler–Lagrange equations ===
The kernel of an Euler–Lagrange operator provides the Euler–Lagrange equations δL = 0.

== Cohomology and Noether's theorems ==
Cohomology of the variational bicomplex leads to the so-called variational formula

$$dL=\delta L + d_H \Theta_L,$$

where

$$d_H\Theta_L=dx^\lambda\wedge d_\lambda\phi, \qquad \phi\in
O^*_\infty(Y)$$

is the total differential and θ_{L} is a Lepage equivalent of L. Noether's first theorem and Noether's second theorem are corollaries of this variational formula.

== Graded manifolds ==
Extended to graded manifolds, the variational bicomplex provides description of graded Lagrangian systems of even and odd variables.

== Alternative formulations ==
In a different way, Lagrangians, Euler–Lagrange operators and Euler–Lagrange equations are introduced in the framework of the calculus of variations.

== Classical mechanics ==
In classical mechanics, equations of motion are first and second order differential equations on a manifold M or various fiber bundles Q over $\mathbb{R}$. A solution of the equations of motion is called a motion.

== See also ==
- Lagrangian mechanics
- Calculus of variations
- Noether's theorem
- Noether identities
- Jet bundle
- Jet (mathematics)
- Variational bicomplex
