= Classical field theory =

Physical theory describing classical fields

A classical field theory is a physical theory that predicts how one or more fields in physics interact with matter through field equations, without considering effects of quantization; theories that incorporate quantum mechanics are called quantum field theories. In most contexts, 'classical field theory' is specifically intended to describe electromagnetism and gravitation, two of the fundamental forces of nature.

A physical field can be thought of as the assignment of a physical quantity at each point of space and time. For example, in a weather forecast, the wind velocity during a day over a country is described by assigning a vector to each point in space. Each vector represents the direction of the movement of air at that point, so the set of all wind vectors in an area at a given point in time constitutes a vector field. As the day progresses, the directions in which the vectors point change as the directions of the wind change.

The first field theories, Newtonian gravitation and Maxwell's equations of electromagnetic fields were developed in classical physics before the advent of relativity theory in 1905, and had to be revised to be consistent with that theory. Consequently, classical field theories are usually categorized as non-relativistic and relativistic. Modern field theories are usually expressed using the mathematics of tensor calculus. A more recent alternative mathematical formalism describes classical fields as sections of mathematical objects called fiber bundles.

The no-interaction theorem shows that fields are necessary to introduce interaction in special relativity.

== History ==
Michael Faraday coined the term "field" and lines of forces to explain electric and magnetic phenomena. Lord Kelvin in 1851 formalized the concept of field in different areas of physics.

== Non-relativistic field theories ==
Some of the simplest physical fields are vector force fields. Historically, the first time that fields were taken seriously was with Faraday's lines of force when describing the electric field. The gravitational field was then similarly described.

=== Newtonian gravitation ===
Computer generated simulation of two bodies orbiting each other with plotted gravitational field

The first field theory of gravity was Newton's theory of gravitation in which the mutual interaction between two masses obeys an inverse square law. This was very useful for predicting the motion of planets around the Sun.

Any massive body M has a gravitational field g which describes its influence on other massive bodies. The gravitational field of M at a point r in space is found by determining the force F that M exerts on a small test mass m located at r, and then dividing by m:
$$\mathbf{g}(\mathbf{r}) = \frac{\mathbf{F}(\mathbf{r})}{m}.$$
Stipulating that m is much smaller than M ensures that the presence of m has a negligible influence on the behavior of M.

According to Newton's law of universal gravitation, F(r) is given by
$$\mathbf{F}(\mathbf{r}) = -\frac{G M m}{r^2}\hat{\mathbf{r}},$$
where $\hat{\mathbf{r}}$ is a unit vector pointing along the line from M to m, and G is Newton's gravitational constant. Therefore, the gravitational field of M is
$$\mathbf{g}(\mathbf{r}) = \frac{\mathbf{F}(\mathbf{r})}{m} = -\frac{G M}{r^2}\hat{\mathbf{r}}.$$

The experimental observation that inertial mass and gravitational mass are equal to unprecedented levels of accuracy leads to the identification of the gravitational field strength as identical to the acceleration experienced by a particle. This is the starting point of the equivalence principle, which leads to general relativity.

For a discrete collection of masses, M_{i}, located at points, r_{i}, the gravitational field at a point r due to the masses is
$$\mathbf{g}(\mathbf{r})=-G\sum_i \frac{M_i(\mathbf{r}-\mathbf{r_i})}{|\mathbf{r}-\mathbf{r}_i|^3} \,,$$

If we have a continuous mass distribution ρ instead, the sum is replaced by an integral,
$$\mathbf{g}(\mathbf{r})=-G \iiint_V \frac{\rho(\mathbf{x})d^3\mathbf{x}(\mathbf{r}-\mathbf{x})}{|\mathbf{r}-\mathbf{x}|^3} \, ,$$

Note that the direction of the field points from the position r to the position of the masses r_{i}; this is ensured by the minus sign. In a nutshell, this means all masses attract.

In the integral form Gauss's law for gravity is
$$\iint\mathbf{g}\cdot d \mathbf{S} = -4\pi G M$$
while in differential form it is
$$\nabla \cdot\mathbf{g} = -4\pi G\rho_m$$

Therefore, the gravitational field g can be written in terms of the gradient of a gravitational potential φ(r):
$$\mathbf{g}(\mathbf{r}) = -\nabla \phi(\mathbf{r}).$$
This is a consequence of the gravitational force F being conservative.

=== Electromagnetism ===
==== Electrostatics ====
A charged test particle with charge q experiences a force F based solely on its charge. We can similarly describe the electric field E generated by the source charge Q so that F = qE:
$$\mathbf{E}(\mathbf{r}) = \frac{\mathbf{F}(\mathbf{r})}{q}.$$

Using this and Coulomb's law the electric field due to a single charged particle is
$$\mathbf{E} = \frac{1}{4\pi\varepsilon_0} \frac{Q}{r^2} \hat{\mathbf{r}} \,.$$

The electric field is conservative, and hence is given by the gradient of a scalar potential, V(r)
$$\mathbf{E}(\mathbf{r}) = -\nabla V(\mathbf{r}) \, .$$

Gauss's law for electricity is in integral form
$$\iint\mathbf{E}\cdot d\mathbf{S} = \frac{Q}{\varepsilon_0}$$
while in differential form
$$\nabla \cdot\mathbf{E} = \frac{\rho_e}{\varepsilon_0} \,.$$

==== Magnetostatics ====
A steady current I flowing along a path ℓ will exert a force on nearby charged particles that is quantitatively different from the electric field force described above. The force exerted by I on a nearby charge q with velocity v is
$$\mathbf{F}(\mathbf{r}) = q\mathbf{v} \times \mathbf{B}(\mathbf{r}),$$
where B(r) is the magnetic field, which is determined from I by the Biot–Savart law:
$$\mathbf{B}(\mathbf{r}) = \frac{\mu_0 I}{4\pi} \int \frac{d\boldsymbol{\ell} \times d\hat{\mathbf{r}}}{r^2}.$$

The magnetic field is not conservative in general, and hence cannot usually be written in terms of a scalar potential. However, it can be written in terms of a vector potential, A(r):
$$\mathbf{B}(\mathbf{r}) = \nabla \times \mathbf{A}(\mathbf{r})$$

Gauss's law for magnetism in integral form is
$$\iint\mathbf{B}\cdot d\mathbf{S} = 0,$$
while in differential form it is
$$\nabla \cdot\mathbf{B} = 0.$$

The physical interpretation is that there are no magnetic monopoles.

==== Electrodynamics ====
In general, in the presence of both a charge density ρ(r, t) and current density J(r, t), there will be both an electric and a magnetic field, and both will vary in time. They are determined by Maxwell's equations, a set of differential equations which directly relate E and B to the electric charge density (charge per unit volume) ρ and current density (electric current per unit area) J.

Alternatively, one can describe the system in terms of its scalar and vector potentials V and A. A set of integral equations known as retarded potentials allow one to calculate V and A from ρ and J, (Note: This is contingent on the correct choice of gauge. φ and A are not uniquely determined by ρ and J; rather, they are only determined up to some scalar function f(r, t) known as the gauge. The retarded potential formalism requires one to choose the Lorenz gauge.) and from there the electric and magnetic fields are determined via the relations
$$\mathbf{E} = -\nabla V - \frac{\partial \mathbf{A}}{\partial t}$$
$$\mathbf{B} = \nabla \times \mathbf{A}.$$

=== Continuum mechanics ===
==== Fluid dynamics ====
Fluid dynamics has fields of pressure, density, and flow rate that are connected by conservation laws for energy and momentum. The mass continuity equation is a continuity equation, representing the conservation of mass
$$\frac{\partial \rho}{\partial t} + \nabla \cdot (\rho \mathbf u) = 0$$
and the Navier–Stokes equations represent the conservation of momentum in the fluid, found from Newton's laws applied to the fluid,
$$\frac {\partial}{\partial t} (\rho \mathbf u) + \nabla \cdot (\rho \mathbf u \otimes \mathbf u + p \mathbf I) = \nabla \cdot \boldsymbol \tau + \rho \mathbf b$$
if the density ρ, pressure p, deviatoric stress tensor τ of the fluid, as well as external body forces b, are all given. The velocity field u is the vector field to solve for.

=== Other examples ===
In 1839, James MacCullagh presented field equations to describe reflection and refraction in "An essay toward a dynamical theory of crystalline reflection and refraction".

== Potential theory ==
The term "potential theory" arises from the fact that, in 19th century physics, the fundamental forces of nature were believed to be derived from scalar potentials which satisfied Laplace's equation. Poisson addressed the question of the stability of the planetary orbits, which had already been settled by Lagrange to the first degree of approximation from the perturbation forces, and derived the Poisson's equation, named after him. The general form of this equation is

$$\nabla^2 \phi = \sigma$$

where σ is a source function (as a density, a quantity per unit volume) and φ the scalar potential to solve for.

In Newtonian gravitation, masses are the sources of the field so that field lines terminate at objects that have mass. Similarly, charges are the sources and sinks of electrostatic fields: positive charges emanate electric field lines, and field lines terminate at negative charges. These field concepts are also illustrated in the general divergence theorem, specifically Gauss's law's for gravity and electricity. For the cases of time-independent gravity and electromagnetism, the fields are gradients of corresponding potentials
$$\mathbf{g} = - \nabla \phi_g \,,\quad \mathbf{E} = - \nabla \phi_e$$
so substituting these into Gauss' law for each case obtains
$$\nabla^2 \phi_g = 4\pi G \rho_g \,, \quad \nabla^2 \phi_e = 4\pi k_e \rho_e = - {\rho_e \over \varepsilon_0}$$

where ρ_{g} is the mass density, ρ_{e} the charge density, G the gravitational constant and k_{e} = 1/4πε_{0} the electric force constant.

Incidentally, this similarity arises from the similarity between Newton's law of gravitation and Coulomb's law.

In the case where there is no source term (e.g. vacuum, or paired charges), these potentials obey Laplace's equation:
$$\nabla^2 \phi = 0.$$

For a distribution of mass (or charge), the potential can be expanded in a series of spherical harmonics, and the nth term in the series can be viewed as a potential arising from the 2^{n}-moments (see multipole expansion). For many purposes only the monopole, dipole, and quadrupole terms are needed in calculations.

== Relativistic field theory ==
Modern formulations of classical field theories generally require Lorentz covariance as this is now recognised as a fundamental aspect of nature. A field theory tends to be expressed mathematically by using Lagrangians. This is a function that, when subjected to an action principle, gives rise to the field equations and a conservation law for the theory. The action is a Lorentz scalar, from which the field equations and symmetries can be readily derived.

Throughout we use units such that the speed of light in vacuum is 1, i.e. c = 1. (Note: This is equivalent to choosing units of distance and time as light-seconds and seconds or light-years and years. Choosing c = 1 allows us to simplify the equations. For instance, E = mc^{2} reduces to E = m (since c^{2} = 1, without keeping track of units). This reduces complexity of the expressions while keeping focus on the underlying principles. This "trick" must be taken into account when performing actual numerical calculations.)

=== Lagrangian dynamics ===
Given a field tensor $\phi$, a scalar called the Lagrangian density
$$\mathcal{L}(\phi,\partial\phi,\partial\partial\phi, \ldots ,x)$$
can be constructed from $\phi$ and its derivatives. From this density, the action functional can be constructed by integrating over spacetime,
$$\mathcal{S} = \int{\mathcal{L}\sqrt{-g}\, \mathrm{d}^4x}.$$

Where $\sqrt{-g} \, \mathrm{d}^4x$ is the volume form in curved spacetime. $(g\equiv \det(g_{\mu\nu}))$

Therefore, the Lagrangian itself is equal to the integral of the Lagrangian density over all space.

Then by enforcing the action principle, the Euler–Lagrange equations are obtained

$$\frac{\delta \mathcal{S}}{\delta\phi} = \frac{\partial\mathcal{L}}{\partial\phi} -\partial_\mu \left(\frac{\partial\mathcal{L}}{\partial(\partial_\mu\phi)}\right)+ \cdots +(-1)^m\partial_{\mu_1} \partial_{\mu_2} \cdots \partial_{\mu_{m-1}} \partial_{\mu_m} \left(\frac{\partial\mathcal{L}}{\partial(\partial_{\mu_1} \partial_{\mu_2}\cdots\partial_{\mu_{m-1}}\partial_{\mu_m} \phi)}\right) = 0.$$

== Relativistic fields ==
Two of the most well-known Lorentz-covariant classical field theories are now described.

=== Electromagnetism ===
Historically, the first (classical) field theories were those describing the electric and magnetic fields (separately). After numerous experiments, it was found that these two fields were related, or, in fact, two aspects of the same field: the electromagnetic field. Maxwell's theory of electromagnetism describes the interaction of charged matter with the electromagnetic field. The first formulation of this field theory used vector fields to describe the electric and magnetic fields. With the advent of special relativity, a more complete formulation using tensor fields was found. Instead of using two vector fields describing the electric and magnetic fields, a tensor field representing these two fields together is used.

The electromagnetic four-potential is defined to be A_{a} = (−φ, A), and the electromagnetic four-current j_{a} = (−ρ, j). The electromagnetic field at any point in spacetime is described by the antisymmetric (0,2)-rank electromagnetic field tensor
$$F_{ab} = \partial_a A_b - \partial_b A_a.$$

==== The Lagrangian ====
To obtain the dynamics for this field, we try and construct a scalar from the field. In the vacuum, we have
$$\mathcal{L} = -\frac{1}{4\mu_0}F^{ab}F_{ab}\,.$$

We can use gauge field theory to get the interaction term, and this gives us
$$\mathcal{L} = -\frac{1}{4\mu_0}F^{ab}F_{ab} - j^aA_a\,.$$

==== The equations ====
To obtain the field equations, the electromagnetic tensor in the Lagrangian density needs to be replaced by its definition in terms of the 4-potential A, and it is this potential which enters the Euler–Lagrange equations. The EM field F is not varied in the EL equations. Therefore,
$$\partial_b\left(\frac{\partial\mathcal{L}}{\partial\left(\partial_b A_a\right)}\right)=\frac{\partial\mathcal{L}}{\partial A_a} \,.$$

Evaluating the derivative of the Lagrangian density with respect to the field components
$$\frac{\partial\mathcal{L}}{\partial A_a} = \mu_0 j^a \,,$$
and the derivatives of the field components
$$\frac{\partial\mathcal{L}}{\partial(\partial_b A_a)} = F^{ab} \,,$$
obtains Maxwell's equations in vacuum. The source equations (Gauss' law for electricity and the Maxwell-Ampère law) are
$$\partial_b F^{ab}=\mu_0 j^a \, .$$
while the other two (Gauss' law for magnetism and Faraday's law) are obtained from the fact that F is the 4-curl of A, or, in other words, from the fact that the Bianchi identity holds for the electromagnetic field tensor.
$$6F_{[ab,c]} \, = F_{ab,c} + F_{ca,b} + F_{bc,a} = 0.$$

where the comma indicates a partial derivative.

=== Gravitation ===
After Newtonian gravitation was found to be inconsistent with special relativity, Albert Einstein formulated a new theory of gravitation called general relativity. This treats gravitation as a geometric phenomenon ('curved spacetime') caused by masses and represents the gravitational field mathematically by a tensor field called the metric tensor. The Einstein field equations describe how this curvature is produced. Newtonian gravitation is now superseded by Einstein's theory of general relativity, in which gravitation is thought of as being due to a curved spacetime, caused by masses. The Einstein field equations,
$$G_{ab} = \kappa T_{ab}$$
describe how this curvature is produced by matter and radiation, where G_{ab} is the Einstein tensor,
$$G_{ab} \, = R_{ab}-\frac{1}{2} R g_{ab}$$
written in terms of the Ricci tensor R_{ab} and Ricci scalar R = R_{ab}g^{ab}, T_{ab} is the stress–energy tensor and κ = 8πG/c^{4} is a constant. In the absence of matter and radiation (including sources) the vacuum field equations,
$$G_{ab} = 0$$
can be derived by varying the Einstein–Hilbert action,
$$S = \int R \sqrt{-g} \, d^4x$$
with respect to the metric, where g is the determinant of the metric tensor g^{ab}. Solutions of the vacuum field equations are called vacuum solutions. An alternative interpretation, due to Arthur Eddington, is that $R$ is fundamental, $T$ is merely one aspect of $R$, and $\kappa$ is forced by the choice of units.

=== Further examples ===
Further examples of Lorentz-covariant classical field theories are

- Klein-Gordon theory for real or complex scalar fields
- Dirac theory for a Dirac spinor field
- Yang–Mills theory for a non-abelian gauge field

== Unification attempts ==
Attempts to create a unified field theory based on classical physics are classical unified field theories. During the years between the two World Wars, the idea of unification of gravity with electromagnetism was actively pursued by several mathematicians and physicists like Albert Einstein, Theodor Kaluza, Hermann Weyl, Arthur Eddington, Gustav Mie and Ernst Reichenbacher.

Early attempts to create such a theory were based on incorporation of electromagnetic fields into the geometry of general relativity. In 1918, the case for the first geometrization of the electromagnetic field was proposed in 1918 by Hermann Weyl. In 1919, the idea of a five-dimensional approach was suggested by Theodor Kaluza. From that, a theory called Kaluza-Klein Theory was developed. It attempts to unify gravitation and electromagnetism, in a five-dimensional space-time. There are several ways of extending the representational framework for a unified field theory which have been considered by Einstein and other researchers. These extensions in general are based in two options. The first option is based in relaxing the conditions imposed on the original formulation, and the second is based in introducing other mathematical objects into the theory. An example of the first option is relaxing the restrictions to four-dimensional space-time by considering higher-dimensional representations. That is used in Kaluza-Klein Theory. For the second, the most prominent example arises from the concept of the affine connection that was introduced into the theory of general relativity mainly through the work of Tullio Levi-Civita and Hermann Weyl.

Further development of quantum field theory changed the focus of searching for unified field theory from classical to quantum description. Because of that, many theoretical physicists gave up looking for a classical unified field theory. Quantum field theory would include unification of two other fundamental forces of nature, the strong and weak nuclear force which act on the subatomic level.

== See also ==
- Relativistic wave equations
- Quantum field theory
- Classical unified field theories
- Variational methods in general relativity
- Higgs field (classical)
- Lagrangian (field theory)
- Hamiltonian field theory
- Covariant Hamiltonian field theory
