= Gauge gravitation theory =

Attempt to extend Yang–Mills theory to gravity

In quantum field theory, gauge gravitation theory is the effort to extend Yang–Mills theory, which provides a universal description of the fundamental interactions, to describe gravity.

Gauge gravitation theory should not be confused with the similarly named gauge theory gravity, which is a formulation of (classical) gravitation in the language of geometric algebra. Nor should it be confused with Kaluza–Klein theory, where the gauge fields are used to describe particle fields, but not gravity itself.

== Overview ==
The first gauge model of gravity was suggested by Ryoyu Utiyama (1916–1990) in 1956 just two years after birth of the gauge theory itself. However, the initial attempts to construct the gauge theory of gravity by analogy with the gauge models of internal symmetries encountered a problem of treating general covariant transformations and establishing the gauge status of a pseudo-Riemannian metric (a tetrad field).

In order to overcome this drawback, representing tetrad fields as gauge fields of the translation group was attempted. Infinitesimal generators of general covariant transformations were considered as those of the translation gauge group, and a tetrad (coframe) field was identified with the translation part of an affine connection on a world manifold $X$. Any such connection is a sum $K=\Gamma + \Theta$ of a linear world connection $\Gamma$ and a soldering form $\Theta= \Theta_\mu^a dx^\mu\otimes\vartheta_a$ where $\vartheta_a=\vartheta_a^\lambda\partial_\lambda$ is a non-holonomic frame. For instance, if $K$ is the Cartan connection, then $\Theta=\theta=dx^\mu\otimes\partial_\mu$ is the canonical soldering form on $X$. There are different physical interpretations of the translation part $\Theta$ of affine connections. In gauge theory of dislocations, a field $\Theta$ describes a distortion. At the same time, given a linear frame $\vartheta_a$, the decomposition $\theta=\vartheta^a\otimes\vartheta_a$ motivates many authors to treat a coframe $\vartheta^a$ as a translation gauge field.

Difficulties of constructing gauge gravitation theory by analogy with the Yang–Mills one result from the gauge transformations in these theories belonging to different classes. In the case of internal symmetries, the gauge transformations are just vertical automorphisms of a principal bundle $P\to X$ leaving its base $X$ fixed. On the other hand, gravitation theory is built on the principal bundle $FX$ of the tangent frames to $X$. It belongs to the category of natural bundles $T\to X$ for which diffeomorphisms of the base $X$ canonically give rise to automorphisms of T. These automorphisms are called general covariant transformations. General covariant transformations are sufficient in order to restate Einstein's general relativity and metric-affine gravitation theory as the gauge ones.

In terms of gauge theory on natural bundles, gauge fields are linear connections on a world manifold $X$, defined as principal connections on the linear frame bundle $FX$, and a metric (tetrad) gravitational field plays the role of a Higgs field responsible for spontaneous symmetry breaking of general covariant transformations.

Spontaneous symmetry breaking is a quantum effect when the vacuum is not invariant under the transformation group. In classical gauge theory, spontaneous symmetry breaking occurs if the structure group $G$ of a principal bundle $P\to X$ is reducible to a closed subgroup $H$, i.e., there exists a principal subbundle of $P$ with the structure group $H$. By virtue of the well-known theorem, there exists one-to-one correspondence between the reduced principal subbundles of $P$ with the structure group $H$ and the global sections of the quotient bundle P / H → X. These sections are treated as classical Higgs fields.

The idea of the pseudo-Riemannian metric as a Higgs field appeared while constructing non-linear (induced) representations of the general linear group GL(4, R), of which the Lorentz group is a Cartan subgroup. The geometric equivalence principle postulating the existence of a reference frame in which Lorentz invariants are defined on the whole world manifold is the theoretical justification for the reduction of the structure group GL(4, R) of the linear frame bundle FX to the Lorentz group. Then the very definition of a pseudo-Riemannian metric on a manifold $X$ as a global section of the quotient bundle FX / O(1, 3) → X leads to its physical interpretation as a Higgs field. The physical reason for world symmetry breaking is the existence of Dirac fermion matter, whose symmetry group is the universal two-sheeted covering SL(2, C) of the restricted Lorentz group, SO^{+}(1, 3).

== See also ==
- Ashtekar variables
- Metric-affine gravitation theory
- Einstein–Cartan theory
- Spontaneous symmetry breaking
- Teleparallelism
- Reduction of the structure group
- Higgs field (classical)
- General covariant transformations
- Equivalence principle (geometric)
- Affine gauge theory
- Classical unified field theories

== Bibliography ==
- Kirsch, I. (2005). "A Higgs mechanism for gravity". Phys. Rev. D. 72 (2) 024001. arXiv:hep-th/0503024. Bibcode:2005PhRvD..72b4001K. doi:10.1103/PhysRevD.72.024001.
- Sardanashvily, G. (2011). "Classical gauge gravitation theory". Int. J. Geom. Methods Mod. Phys. 8 (8): 1869–1895. arXiv:1110.1176. Bibcode:2011IJGMM..08.1869S. doi:10.1142/S0219887811005993.
- Obukhov, Yu. (2006). "Poincaré gauge gravity: Selected topics". Int. J. Geom. Methods Mod. Phys. 3: 95–138. arXiv:gr-qc/0601090. doi:10.1142/S021988780600103X.
