= Linear connection =

In the mathematical field of differential geometry, the term linear connection can refer to either of the following overlapping concepts:

- a connection on a vector bundle, often viewed as a differential operator (a Koszul connection or covariant derivative);
- a principal connection on the frame bundle of a manifold or the induced connection on any associated bundle — such a connection is equivalently given by a Cartan connection for the affine group of affine space, and is often called an affine connection.

The two meanings overlap, for example, in the notion of a linear connection on the tangent bundle of a manifold.

In older literature, the term linear connection is occasionally used for an Ehresmann connection or Cartan connection on an arbitrary fiber bundle, to emphasise that these connections are "linear in the horizontal direction" (i.e., the horizontal bundle is a vector subbundle of the tangent bundle of the fiber bundle), even if they are not "linear in the vertical (fiber) direction". However, connections which are not linear in this sense have received little attention outside the study of spray structures and Finsler geometry.
