= Inverse bundle =

Topology in mathematics

In mathematics, the inverse bundle of a fibre bundle is its inverse with respect to the Whitney sum operation.

Let $E \rightarrow M$ be a fibre bundle. A bundle $E' \rightarrow M$ is called the inverse bundle of $E$ if their Whitney sum is a trivial bundle, namely if

$$E \oplus E' \cong M \times \mathbb{R}^n. \,$$

Any vector bundle over a compact Hausdorff base has an inverse bundle.
