= Double vector bundle =

In mathematics, a double vector bundle is the combination of two compatible vector bundle structures, which contains in particular the tangent $TE$ of a vector bundle $E$ and the double tangent bundle $T^2M$.

== Definition and first consequences ==
A double vector bundle consists of $(E, E^H, E^V, B)$, where

1. the side bundles $E^H$ and $E^V$ are vector bundles over the base $B$,
2. $E$ is a vector bundle on both side bundles $E^H$ and $E^V$,
3. the projection, the addition, the scalar multiplication and the zero map on E for both vector bundle structures are morphisms.

== Double vector bundle morphism ==
A double vector bundle morphism $(f_E, f_H, f_V, f_B)$ consists of maps $f_E : E \mapsto E'$, $f_H : E^H \mapsto E^H{}'$, $f_V : E^V \mapsto E^V{}'$ and $f_B : B \mapsto B'$ such that $(f_E, f_V)$ is a bundle morphism from $(E, E^V)$ to $(E', E^V{}')$, $(f_E, f_H)$ is a bundle morphism from $(E, E^H)$ to $(E', E^H{}')$, $(f_V, f_B)$ is a bundle morphism from $(E^V, B)$ to $(E^V{}', B')$ and $(f_H, f_B)$ is a bundle morphism from $(E^H, B)$ to $(E^H{}', B')$.

The 'flip of the double vector bundle $(E, E^H, E^V, B)$ is the double vector bundle $(E, E^V, E^H, B)$.

== Examples ==
If $(E, M)$ is a vector bundle over a differentiable manifold $M$ then $(TE, E, TM, M)$ is a double vector bundle when considering its secondary vector bundle structure.

If $M$ is a differentiable manifold, then its double tangent bundle $(TTM, TM, TM, M)$ is a double vector bundle.
