= Secondary vector bundle structure =

Mathematical concept in particularly differential topology

In mathematics, particularly differential topology, the secondary vector bundle structure refers to the natural vector bundle structure (TE, p_{∗}, TM) on the total space TE of the tangent bundle of a smooth vector bundle (E, p, M), induced by the push-forward p_{∗} : TE → TM of the original projection map p : E → M. This gives rise to a double vector bundle structure (TE,E,TM,M).

In the special case (E, p, M) = (TM, π_{TM}, M), where TE = TTM is the double tangent bundle, the secondary vector bundle (TTM, (π_{TM})_{∗}, TM) is isomorphic to the tangent bundle (TTM, π_{TTM}, TM) of TM through the canonical flip.

== Construction of the secondary vector bundle structure ==
Let (E, p, M) be a smooth vector bundle of rank N. Then the preimage (p_{∗})^{−1}(X) ⊂ TE of any tangent vector X in TM in the push-forward p_{∗} : TE → TM of the canonical projection p : E → M is a smooth submanifold of dimension 2N, and it becomes a vector space with the push-forwards

$$+_*:T(E \times_{\! M} \! E) \to TE, \qquad \lambda_*:TE\to TE$$

of the original addition and scalar multiplication

$$+:E \times_{\! M} \! E \to E, \qquad \lambda:E\to E$$

as its vector space operations. It becomes clear $+_*$ actually defines addition on the fibers of $p_*$ as $T(E \times_{\!M} \! E) = TE \times_{TM} TE$. The triple (TE, p_{∗}, TM) becomes a smooth vector bundle with these vector space operations on its fibres.

=== Proof ===
Let (U, φ) be a local coordinate system on the base manifold M with φ(x) = (x^{1}, ..., x^{n}) and let

$$\begin{cases}\psi:W \to \varphi(U)\times \mathbf{R}^N \\ \psi \left (v^k e_k|_x \right ) := \left (x^1,\ldots,x^n,v^1,\ldots,v^N \right )\end{cases}$$

be a coordinate system on $W:=p^{-1}(U)\subset E$ adapted to it. Then

$$p_*\left (X^k\frac{\partial}{\partial x^k}\Bigg|_v + Y^\ell\frac{\partial}{\partial v^\ell}\Bigg|_v \right) = X^k\frac{\partial}{\partial x^k}\Bigg|_{p(v)},$$

so the fiber of the secondary vector bundle structure at X in T_{x}M is of the form

$$p^{-1}_*(X) = \left \{ X^k\frac{\partial}{\partial x^k}\Bigg|_v + Y^\ell\frac{\partial}{\partial v^\ell}\Bigg|_v \ : \ v\in E_x;  Y^1,\ldots,Y^N\in\mathbf{R} \right \}.$$

Now it turns out that

$$\chi\left(X^k\frac{\partial}{\partial x^k}\Bigg|_v + Y^\ell\frac{\partial}{\partial v^\ell}\Bigg|_v\right ) = \left (X^k\frac{\partial}{\partial x^k}\Bigg|_{p(v)}, \left (v^1,\ldots,v^N,Y^1,\ldots,Y^N \right) \right )$$

gives a local trivialization χ : TW → TU × R^{2N} for (TE, p_{∗}, TM), and the push-forwards of the original vector space operations read in the adapted coordinates as

$$\left (X^k\frac{\partial}{\partial x^k}\Bigg|_v + Y^\ell\frac{\partial}{\partial v^\ell}\Bigg|_v\right) +_* \left (X^k\frac{\partial}{\partial x^k}\Bigg|_w + Z^\ell\frac{\partial}{\partial v^\ell}\Bigg|_w\right) = X^k\frac{\partial}{\partial x^k}\Bigg|_{v+w} + (Y^\ell+Z^\ell)\frac{\partial}{\partial v^\ell}\Bigg|_{v+w}$$

and

$$\lambda_*\left (X^k\frac{\partial}{\partial x^k}\Bigg|_v + Y^\ell\frac{\partial}{\partial v^\ell}\Bigg|_v\right) = X^k\frac{\partial}{\partial x^k}\Bigg|_{\lambda v} + \lambda Y^\ell\frac{\partial}{\partial v^\ell}\Bigg|_{\lambda v},$$

so each fibre (p_{∗})^{−1}(X) ⊂ TE is a vector space and the triple (TE, p_{∗}, TM) is a smooth vector bundle.

== Linearity of connections on vector bundles ==
The general Ehresmann connection TE = HE ⊕ VE on a vector bundle (E, p, M) can be characterized in terms of the connector map

$$\begin{cases}\kappa:T_vE\to E_{p(v)} \\ \kappa(X):=\operatorname{vl}_v^{-1}(\operatorname{vpr}X) \end{cases}$$

where vl_{v} : E → V_{v}E is the vertical lift, and vpr_{v} : T_{v}E → V_{v}E is the vertical projection. The mapping

$$\begin{cases}\nabla:\Gamma(TM)\times\Gamma(E)\to\Gamma(E) \\ \nabla_Xv := \kappa(v_*X) \end{cases}$$

induced by an Ehresmann connection is a covariant derivative on Γ(E) in the sense that

$$\begin{align}
\nabla_{X+Y}v &= \nabla_X v + \nabla_Y v \\
\nabla_{\lambda X}v &=\lambda \nabla_Xv \\
\nabla_X(v+w) &= \nabla_X v + \nabla_X w \\
\nabla_X(\lambda v) &=\lambda \nabla_Xv \\
\nabla_X(fv) &= X[f]v + f\nabla_Xv
\end{align}$$

if and only if the connector map is linear with respect to the secondary vector bundle structure (TE, p_{∗}, TM) on TE. Then the connection is called linear. Note that the connector map is automatically linear with respect to the tangent bundle structure (TE, π_{TE}, E).

== See also ==
- Connection (vector bundle)
- Double tangent bundle
- Ehresmann connection
- Vector bundle
