= Tango bundle =

In algebraic geometry, a Tango bundle is one of the indecomposable vector bundles of rank n − 1 constructed on n-dimensional projective space P^{n} by Tango (1976)
