= Horrocks bundle =

Algebraic geometry term

In algebraic geometry, Horrocks bundles are certain indecomposable rank 3 vector bundles (locally free sheaves) on 5-dimensional projective space, found by Horrocks (1978).
