= Unit tangent bundle =

In Riemannian geometry, the unit tangent bundle of a Riemannian manifold (M, g), denoted by T^{1}M, UT(M), UTM, or SM is the unit sphere bundle for the tangent bundle T(M). It is a fiber bundle over M whose fiber at each point is the unit sphere in the tangent space:

$$\mathrm{UT} (M) := \coprod_{x \in M} \left\{ v \in \mathrm{T}_{x} (M) \left| g_x(v,v) = 1 \right. \right\},$$

where T_{x}(M) denotes the tangent space to M at x. Thus, elements of UT(M) are pairs (x, v), where x is some point of the manifold and v is some tangent direction (of unit length) to the manifold at x. The unit tangent bundle is equipped with a natural projection

$$\pi : \mathrm{UT} (M) \to M,$$
$$\pi : (x, v) \mapsto x,$$

which takes each point of the bundle to its base point. The fiber π^{−1}(x) over each point x ∈ M is an (n−1)-sphere S^{n−1}, where n is the dimension of M. The unit tangent bundle is therefore a sphere bundle over M with fiber S^{n−1}.

The definition of unit sphere bundle can easily accommodate Finsler manifolds as well. Specifically, if M is a manifold equipped with a Finsler metric F : TM → R, then the unit sphere bundle is the subbundle of the tangent bundle whose fiber at x is the indicatrix of F:

$$\mathrm{UT}_x (M) = \left\{ v \in \mathrm{T}_{x} (M) \left| F(v) = 1 \right. \right\}.$$

If M is an infinite-dimensional manifold (for example, a Banach, Fréchet or Hilbert manifold), then UT(M) can still be thought of as the unit sphere bundle for the tangent bundle T(M), but the fiber π^{−1}(x) over x is then the infinite-dimensional unit sphere in the tangent space.

== Structures ==
The unit tangent bundle carries a variety of differential geometric structures. The metric on M induces a contact structure on UTM. This is given in terms of a tautological one-form, defined at a point u of UTM (a unit tangent vector of M) by

$$\theta_u(v) = g(u,\pi_* v)\,$$

where $\pi_*$ is the pushforward along π of the vector v ∈ T_{u}UTM.

Geometrically, this contact structure can be regarded as the distribution of (2n−2)-planes which, at the unit vector u, is the pullback of the orthogonal complement of u in the tangent space of M. This is a contact structure, for the fiber of UTM is obviously an integral manifold (the vertical bundle is everywhere in the kernel of θ), and the remaining tangent directions are filled out by moving up the fiber of UTM. Thus the maximal integral manifold of θ is (an open set of) M itself.

On a Finsler manifold, the contact form is defined by the analogous formula

$$\theta_u(v) = g_u(u,\pi_*v)\,$$

where g_{u} is the fundamental tensor (the hessian of the Finsler metric). Geometrically, the associated distribution of hyperplanes at the point u ∈ UT_{x}M is the inverse image under π_{*} of the tangent hyperplane to the unit sphere in T_{x}M at u.

The volume form θ∧dθ^{n−1} defines a measure on M, known as the kinematic measure, or Liouville measure, that is invariant under the geodesic flow of M. As a Radon measure, the kinematic measure μ is defined on compactly supported continuous functions ƒ on UTM by

$$\int_{UTM} f\,d\mu = \int_M dV(p) \int_{UT_pM} \left.f\right|_{UT_pM}\,d\mu_p$$

where dV is the volume element on M, and μ_{p} is the standard rotationally-invariant Borel measure on the Euclidean sphere UT_{p}M.

The Levi-Civita connection of M gives rise to a splitting of the tangent bundle

$$T(UTM) = H\oplus V$$

into a vertical space V = kerπ_{*} and horizontal space H on which π_{*} is a linear isomorphism at each point of UTM. This splitting induces a metric on UTM by declaring that this splitting be an orthogonal direct sum, and defining the metric on H by the pullback:

$$g_H(v,w) = g(v,w),\quad v,w\in H$$

and defining the metric on V as the induced metric from the embedding of the fiber UT_{x}M into the Euclidean space T_{x}M. Equipped with this metric and contact form, UTM becomes a Sasakian manifold.

== Bibliography ==
- Jeffrey M. Lee: Manifolds and Differential Geometry. Graduate Studies in Mathematics Vol. 107, American Mathematical Society, Providence (2009). ISBN 978-0-8218-4815-9
- Jürgen Jost: Riemannian Geometry and Geometric Analysis, (2002) Springer-Verlag, Berlin. ISBN 3-540-42627-2
- Ralph Abraham und Jerrold E. Marsden: Foundations of Mechanics, (1978) Benjamin-Cummings, London. ISBN 0-8053-0102-X
