= Dual bundle =

Mathematical operation on vector bundles

In mathematics, the dual bundle is an operation on vector bundles extending the operation of duality for vector spaces.

== Definition ==
The dual bundle of a vector bundle $\pi: E \to X$ is the vector bundle $\pi^*: E^* \to X$ whose fibers are the dual spaces to the fibers of $E$.

Equivalently, $E^*$ can be defined as the Hom bundle $\mathrm{Hom}(E,\mathbb{R} \times X)$, that is, the vector bundle of morphisms from $E$ to the trivial line bundle $\R \times X \to X$.

== Constructions and examples ==
Given a local trivialization of $E$ with transition functions $t_{ij},$ a local trivialization of $E^*$ is given by the same open cover of $X$ with transition functions $t_{ij}^* = (t_{ij}^T)^{-1}$ (the inverse of the transpose). The dual bundle $E^*$ is then constructed using the fiber bundle construction theorem. As particular cases:

- The dual bundle of an associated bundle is the bundle associated to the dual representation of the structure group.
- The dual bundle of the tangent bundle of a differentiable manifold is its cotangent bundle.

== Properties ==
If the base space $X$ is paracompact and Hausdorff then a real, finite-rank vector bundle $E$ and its dual $E^*$ are isomorphic as vector bundles. However, just as for vector spaces, there is no natural choice of isomorphism unless $E$ is equipped with an inner product.

This is not true in the case of complex vector bundles: for example, the tautological line bundle over the Riemann sphere is not isomorphic to its dual. The dual $E^*$ of a complex vector bundle $E$ is indeed isomorphic to the conjugate bundle $\overline{E},$ but the choice of isomorphism is non-canonical unless $E$ is equipped with a hermitian product.

The Hom bundle $\mathrm{Hom}(E_1,E_2)$ of two vector bundles is canonically isomorphic to the tensor product bundle $E_1^* \otimes E_2.$

Given a morphism $f : E_1 \to E_2$ of vector bundles over the same space, there is a morphism $f^*: E_2^* \to E_1^*$ between their dual bundles (in the converse order), defined fibrewise as the transpose of each linear map $f_x: (E_1)_x \to (E_2)_x.$ Accordingly, the dual bundle operation defines a contravariant functor from the category of vector bundles and their morphisms to itself.
