= Tensor product bundle =

In differential geometry, the tensor product of vector bundles E, F (over the same space X) is a vector bundle, denoted by E ⊗ F, whose fiber over each point x ∈ X is the tensor product of vector spaces E_{x} ⊗ F_{x}.

Example: If O is a trivial line bundle, then E ⊗ O = E for any E.

Example: E ⊗ E^{∗} is canonically isomorphic to the endomorphism bundle End(E), where E^{∗} is the dual bundle of E.

Example: A line bundle L has a tensor inverse: in fact, L ⊗ L^{∗} is (isomorphic to) a trivial bundle by the previous example, as End(L) is trivial. Thus, the set of the isomorphism classes of all line bundles on some topological space X forms an abelian group called the Picard group of X.

== Variants ==
One can also define a symmetric power and an exterior power of a vector bundle in a similar way. For example, a section of $\Lambda^p T^* M$ is a differential p-form and a section of $\Lambda^p T^* M \otimes E$ is a differential p-form with values in a vector bundle E.

== See also ==
- Tensor product of modules
