= Double tangent bundle =

In mathematics, particularly differential topology, the double tangent bundle or the second tangent bundle refers to the tangent bundle (TTM,π_{TTM},TM) of the total space TM of the tangent bundle (TM,π_{TM},M) of a smooth manifold M . A note on notation: in this article, we denote projection maps by their domains, e.g., π_{TTM} : TTM → TM. Some authors index these maps by their ranges instead, so for them, that map would be written π_{TM}.

The second tangent bundle arises in the study of connections and second order ordinary differential equations, i.e., (semi)spray structures on smooth manifolds, and it is not to be confused with the second order jet bundle.

== Secondary vector bundle structure and canonical flip ==
Since (TM,π_{TM},M) is a vector bundle in its own right, its tangent bundle has the secondary vector bundle structure (TTM,(π_{TM})_{*},TM), where (π_{TM})_{*}:TTM→TM is the push-forward of the canonical projection π_{TM}:TM→M. In the following we denote

$$\xi = \xi^k\frac{\partial}{\partial x^k}\Big|_x\in T_xM, \qquad X = X^k\frac{\partial}{\partial x^k}\Big|_x\in T_xM$$

and apply the associated coordinate system

$$\xi \mapsto (x^1,\ldots,x^n,\xi^1,\ldots,\xi^n)$$

on TM. Then the fibre of the secondary vector bundle structure at X∈T_{x}M takes the form

$$(\pi_{TM})^{-1}_*(X) = \Big\{ \ X^k\frac{\partial}{\partial x^k}\Big|_\xi + Y^k\frac{\partial}{\partial\xi^k}\Big|_\xi
\ \Big| \ \xi\in T_xM \ , \ Y^1,\ldots,Y^n\in\R \ \Big\}.$$

The double tangent bundle is a double vector bundle.

The canonical flip is a smooth involution j:TTM→TTM that exchanges these vector space structures in the sense that it is a vector bundle isomorphism between (TTM,π_{TTM},TM) and (TTM,(π_{TM})_{*},TM). In the associated coordinates on TM it reads as

$$j\Big(X^k\frac{\partial}{\partial x^k}\Big|_\xi + Y^k\frac{\partial}{\partial \xi^k}\Big|_\xi\Big)
= \xi^k\frac{\partial}{\partial x^k}\Big|_X + Y^k\frac{\partial}{\partial \xi^k}\Big|_X.$$

The canonical flip has the property that for any f: R^{2} → M,

$$\frac {\partial f} {{\partial t} {\partial s}} = j \circ \frac {\partial f} {{\partial s} {\partial t}}$$

where s and t are coordinates of the standard basis of R ^{2}. Note that both partial derivatives are functions from R^{2} to TTM.

This property can, in fact, be used to give an intrinsic definition of the canonical flip. Indeed, there is a submersion p: J^{2}_{0} (R^{2},M) → TTM given by

$$p([f])=\frac {\partial f} {{\partial t} {\partial s}} (0,0)$$

where p can be defined in the space of two-jets at zero because only depends on f up to order two at zero. We consider the application:

$$J: J^2_0(\mathbb{R}^2,M) \to J^2_0(\mathbb{R}^2,M) \quad / \quad J([f])=[f \circ \alpha]$$

where α(s,t)= (t,s). Then J is compatible with the projection p and induces the canonical flip on the quotient TTM.

== Canonical tensor fields on the tangent bundle ==
As for any vector bundle, the tangent spaces T_{ξ}(T_{x}M) of the fibres T_{x}M of the tangent bundle (TM,π_{TM},M) can be identified with the fibres T_{x}M themselves. Formally this is achieved through the vertical lift, which is a natural vector space isomorphism vl_{ξ}:T_{x}M→V_{ξ}(T_{x}M) defined as

$$(\operatorname{vl}_\xi X)[f]:=\frac{d}{dt}\Big|_{t=0}f(x,\xi+tX), \qquad f\in C^\infty(TM).$$

The vertical lift can also be seen as a natural vector bundle isomorphism vl:(π_{TM})^{*}TM→VTM from the pullback bundle of (TM,π_{TM},M) over π_{TM}:TM→M onto the vertical tangent bundle

$$VTM:=\operatorname{Ker}(\pi_{TM})_* \subset TTM.$$

The vertical lift lets us define the canonical vector field

$$V:TM\to TTM; \qquad V_\xi := \operatorname{vl}_\xi\xi,$$

which is smooth in the slit tangent bundle TM\0. The canonical vector field can be also defined as the infinitesimal generator of the Lie-group action

$$\mathbb R\times (TM\setminus 0) \to TM\setminus 0; \qquad (t,\xi) \mapsto e^t\xi.$$

Unlike the canonical vector field, which can be defined for any vector bundle, the canonical endomorphism

$$J:TTM\to TTM; \qquad J_\xi X := \operatorname{vl}_\xi(\pi_{TM})_*X, \qquad X\in T_\xi TM$$

is special to the tangent bundle. The canonical endomorphism J satisfies

$$\operatorname{Ran}(J)=\operatorname{Ker}(J)=VTM, \qquad \mathcal L_VJ= -J, \qquad [JX,JY]=J[JX,Y]+J[X,JY],$$

and it is also known as the tangent structure for the following reason. If (E,p,M) is any vector bundle with the canonical vector field V and a (1,1)-tensor field J that satisfies the properties listed above, with VE in place of VTM, then the vector bundle (E,p,M) is isomorphic to the tangent bundle (TM,π_{TM},M) of the base manifold, and J corresponds to the tangent structure of TM in this isomorphism.

There is also a stronger result of this kind which states that if N is a 2n-dimensional manifold and if there exists a (1,1)-tensor field J on N that satisfies

$$\operatorname{Ran}(J)=\operatorname{Ker}(J), \qquad [JX,JY]=J[JX,Y]+J[X,JY],$$

then N is diffeomorphic to an open set of the total space of a tangent bundle of some n-dimensional manifold M, and J corresponds to the tangent structure of TM in this diffeomorphism.

In any associated coordinate system on TM the canonical vector field and the canonical endomorphism have the coordinate representations

$$V = \xi^k\frac{\partial}{\partial \xi^k}, \qquad J = dx^k\otimes\frac{\partial}{\partial \xi^k}.$$

== (Semi)spray structures ==
A Semispray structure on a smooth manifold M is by definition a smooth vector field H on TM \0 such that JH=V. An equivalent definition is that j(H)=H, where j:TTM→TTM is the canonical flip. A semispray H is a spray, if in addition, [V,H]=H.

Spray and semispray structures are invariant versions of second order ordinary differential equations on M. The difference between spray and semispray structures is that the solution curves of sprays are invariant in positive reparametrizations as point sets on M, whereas solution curves of semisprays typically are not.

== Nonlinear covariant derivatives on smooth manifolds ==
The canonical flip makes it possible to define nonlinear covariant derivatives on smooth manifolds as follows. Let

$$T(TM\setminus 0) = H(TM\setminus 0) \oplus V(TM\setminus 0)$$

be an Ehresmann connection on the slit tangent bundle TM\0 and consider the mapping

$$D:(TM\setminus 0)\times \Gamma(TM) \to TM; \quad D_XY :=  (\kappa\circ j)(Y_*X),$$

where Y_{*}:TM→TTM is the push-forward, j:TTM→TTM is the canonical flip and κ:T(TM/0)→TM/0 is the connector map. The mapping D_{X} is a derivation in the module Γ (TM) of smooth vector fields on M in the sense that

- $D_X(\alpha Y + \beta Z) = \alpha D_XY + \beta D_XZ, \qquad \alpha,\beta\in\mathbb R$.
- $D_X(fY) = X[f]Y + f D_XY, \qquad \qquad \qquad f\in C^\infty(M)$.

Any mapping D_{X} with these properties is called a (nonlinear) covariant derivative on M. The term nonlinear refers to the fact that this kind of covariant derivative D_{X} on is not necessarily linear with respect to the direction X∈TM/0 of the differentiation.

Looking at the local representations one can confirm that the Ehresmann connections on (TM/0,π_{TM/0},M) and nonlinear covariant derivatives on M are in one-to-one correspondence. Furthermore, if D_{X} is linear in X, then the Ehresmann connection is linear in the secondary vector bundle structure, and D_{X} coincides with its linear covariant derivative.

== See also ==
- Spray (mathematics)
- Secondary vector bundle structure
- Finsler manifold
