= Intrinsic metric =

Concept in geometry/topology

In the mathematical study of metric spaces, one can consider the arclength of paths in the space. If two points are at a given distance from each other, it is natural to expect that one should be able to get from the first point to the second along a path whose arclength is equal to (or very close to) that distance. The distance between two points of a metric space relative to the intrinsic metric is defined as the infimum of the lengths of all paths from the first point to the second. A metric space is a length metric space if the intrinsic metric agrees with the original metric of the space.

If the space has the stronger property that there always exists a path that achieves the infimum of length (a geodesic) then it is called a geodesic metric space. For instance, the Euclidean plane is a geodesic space, with line segments as its geodesics. The Euclidean plane with the origin removed is not geodesic, but is still a length metric space.

== Definitions ==
Let $(M, d)$ be a metric space, i.e., $M$ is a collection of points (such as all of the points in the plane, or all points on the circle) and $d$ is a function that outputs the distance between points in $M$. We define a new metric $d_\text{I}$ on $M$, known as the induced intrinsic metric, as follows: $d_\text{I}(x,y)$ is the infimum of the lengths of all paths from $x$ to $y$.

Here, a path from $x$ to $y$ is a continuous map

$$\gamma \colon [0,1] \rightarrow M$$

with $\gamma(0) = x$ and $\gamma(1) = y$. The length of such a path is defined as follows: to each finite partition

$$P = \{0=x_0 < x_1 < ... < x_n = 1\}$$

of the interval $[0,1]$, consider the sum

$$\Sigma(P) = \sum_{k=0}^{n-1} d(\gamma(x_k),\gamma(x_{k+1})).$$

We then define the length of $\gamma$ to be

$$\ell( \gamma) = \sup_{P \in \mathfrak{P}} \Sigma(P),$$

where $\mathfrak{P}$ is the set of finite partitions of $[0,1]$. If the supremum is finite, we call $\gamma$ a rectifiable curve. Note that $d_\text{I}(x,y) =\infty$ if there is no path from $x$ to $y$ since the infimum of the empty set within the closed interval [0,+∞] is +∞.

The mapping $d\mapsto d_\text{I}$ is idempotent, i.e.

$$(d_\text{I})_\text{I} = d_\text{I}.$$

If

$$d_\text{I}(x,y)=d(x,y)$$

for all points $x$ and $y$ in $M$, we say that $(M, d)$ is a length space or a path metric space and the metric $d$ is intrinsic.

We say that the metric $d$ has approximate midpoints if for any $\varepsilon>0$ and any pair of points $x$ and $y$ in $M$ there exists $c$ in $M$ such that $d(x,c)$ and $d(c,y)$ are both smaller than

$${d(x,y) \over 2} + \varepsilon.$$

== Examples ==
- Euclidean space $\R^n$ with the ordinary Euclidean metric is a path metric space. $\R^n \smallsetminus \{0\}$ is as well.
- The unit circle $S^1$ with the metric inherited from the Euclidean metric of $\R^2$ (the chordal metric) is not a path metric space. The induced intrinsic metric on $S^1$ measures distances as angles in radians, and the resulting length metric space is called the Riemannian circle. In two dimensions, the chordal metric on the sphere is not intrinsic, and the induced intrinsic metric is given by the great-circle distance.
- Every connected Riemannian manifold can be turned into a path metric space by defining the distance of two points as the infimum of the lengths of continuously differentiable curves connecting the two points. (The Riemannian structure allows one to define the length of such curves.) Analogously, other manifolds in which a length is defined included Finsler manifolds and sub-Riemannian manifolds.
- Any complete and convex metric space is a length metric space (Khamsi & Kirk 2001, Theorem 2.16), a result of Karl Menger. However, the converse does not hold, i.e. there exist length metric spaces that are not convex.

== Properties ==
- In general, we have $d \le d_\text{I}$ and the topology defined by $d_\text{I}$ is therefore always finer than or equal to the one defined by $d$.
- The space $(M, d_\text{I})$ is always a path metric space (with the caveat, as mentioned above, that $d_\text{I}$ can be infinite).
- The metric of a length space has approximate midpoints. Conversely, every complete metric space with approximate midpoints is a length space.
- The Hopf–Rinow theorem states that if a length space $(M,d)$ is complete and locally compact then any two points in $M$ can be connected by a minimizing geodesic and all bounded closed sets in $M$ are compact.
