= Smooth functor =

In differential topology, a branch of mathematics, a smooth functor is a type of functor defined on finite-dimensional real vector spaces. Intuitively, a smooth functor is smooth in the sense that it sends smoothly parameterized families of vector spaces to smoothly parameterized families of vector spaces. Smooth functors may therefore be uniquely extended to functors defined on vector bundles.

Let Vect be the category of finite-dimensional real vector spaces whose morphisms consist of all linear mappings, and let F be a covariant functor that maps Vect to itself. For vector spaces T, U ∈ Vect, the functor F induces a mapping

$$F : \mathrm{Hom}_{\mathbf{Vect}}(T,U) \rightarrow \mathrm{Hom}_{\mathbf{Vect}}(F(T),F(U)),$$

where Hom is notation for Hom functor. If this map is smooth as a map of infinitely differentiable manifolds then F is said to be a smooth functor.

Common smooth functors include, for some vector space W:

F(W) = ⊗^{n}W, the nth iterated tensor product;
F(W) = Λ^{n}(W), the nth exterior power; and
F(W) = Sym^{n}(W), the nth symmetric power.

Smooth functors are significant because any smooth functor can be applied fiberwise to a differentiable vector bundle on a manifold. Smoothness of the functor is the condition required to ensure that the patching data for the bundle are smooth as mappings of manifolds. For instance, because the nth exterior power of a vector space defines a smooth functor, the nth exterior power of a smooth vector bundle is also a smooth vector bundle.

Although there are established methods for proving smoothness of standard constructions on finite-dimensional vector bundles, smooth functors can be generalized to categories of topological vector spaces and vector bundles on infinite-dimensional Fréchet manifolds.

== See also ==
- Smooth infinitesimal analysis
- Synthetic differential geometry
