= Finsler manifold =

Generalization of Riemannian manifolds

In mathematics, particularly differential geometry, a Finsler manifold is a differentiable manifold M where a (possibly asymmetric) Minkowski norm F(x, −) is provided on each tangent space T_{x}M, that enables one to define the length of any smooth curve γ : [a, b] → M as

$$L(\gamma) = \int_a^b F\left(\gamma(t), \dot{\gamma}(t)\right)\,\mathrm{d}t.$$

Finsler manifolds are more general than Riemannian manifolds since the tangent norms need not be induced by inner products. Despite their generality, many concepts in Riemannian geometry still exist, including length, geodesics, curvature, connections, covariant derivative, and Cartan structural equations, except that they are lifted from the manifold to the tangent bundle. However, normal coordinates do not.

Every Finsler manifold becomes an intrinsic quasimetric space when the distance between two points is defined as the infimum length of the curves that join them.

Élie Cartan (1933) named Finsler manifolds after Paul Finsler, who studied this geometry in his dissertation (Finsler 1918).

== Definition ==
A Finsler manifold is a differentiable manifold M together with a Finsler metric, which is a continuous nonnegative function F: TM → [0, +∞) defined on the tangent bundle so that for each point x of M,

- F(v + w) ≤ F(v) + F(w) for every two vectors v,w tangent to M at x (subadditivity).
- F(λv) = λF(v) for all λ ≥ 0 (but not necessarily for λ < 0) (positive homogeneity).
- F(v) > 0 unless v = 0 (positive definiteness).

In other words, F(x, −) is an asymmetric norm on each tangent space T_{x}M. The Finsler metric F is also required to be smooth, more precisely:

- F is smooth on the complement of the zero section of TM.

The subadditivity axiom may then be replaced by the following strong convexity condition:

- For each tangent vector v ≠ 0, the Hessian matrix of F^{2} at v is positive definite.

Here the Hessian of F^{2} at v is the symmetric bilinear form

$$g_v(X, Y) := \frac{1}{2}\left.\frac{\partial^2}{\partial s\partial t}\left[F(v + sX + tY)^2\right]\right|_{s=t=0},$$

also known as the fundamental tensor of F at v. Strong convexity of F implies the subadditivity with a strict inequality if u/F(u) ≠ v/F(v). This can be interpreted as having a smooth family of Riemannian metrics defined on every point in $T(M)/\R^+$, the space of all line-directions. Intuitively, "how long something is depends on which way you are looking".

A Finsler metric is reversible if $F(-v) = F(v)$. A Finsler metric is reversible iff it defines a norm on each tangent space. Finsler gave walking time as an example non-reversible metric: walking uphill is slower than walking downhill.

=== Visualization ===
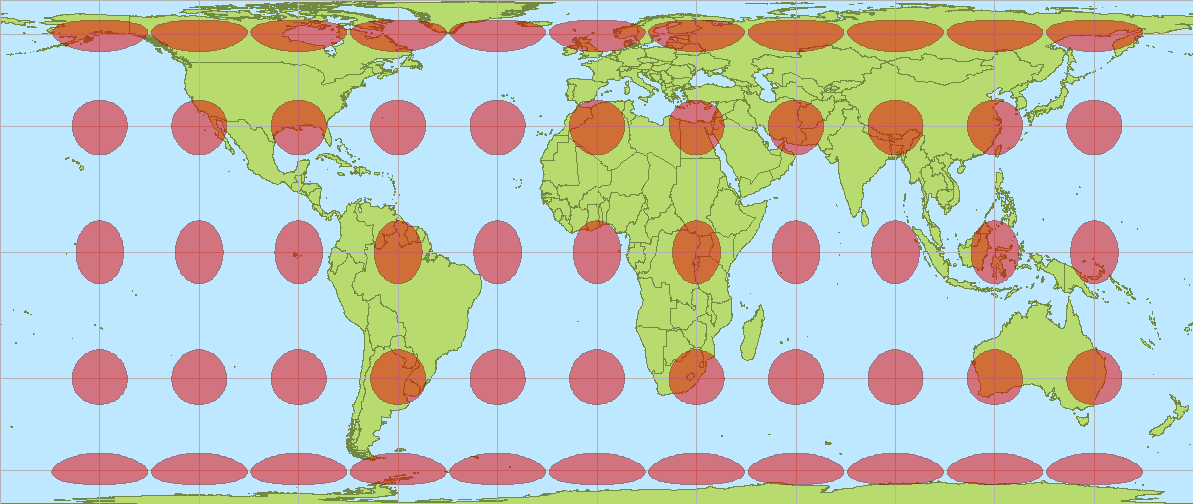
The Behrmann projection with Tissot's indicatrices

The geometry of a Finsler manifold may be visualized by the Tissot indicatrix construction, i.e. by drawing the balls of unit radius in the tangent space of each point. The Finsler function is then just the Minkowski function of these balls.

Positive homogeneity means that the graph of $v \mapsto F(x, v)$, plotted on $T_xM$, looks like a cone with the unit ball being its cross-section.

Positive definiteness means each ball is bounded and contains the origin in its interior.

Smoothness and strong convexity imply that the balls have smooth and strongly convex boundaries that vary smoothly as the base point is changed. Strong convexity geometrically means that, at any point on the boundary of a ball, the local boundary osculates a hyperellipsoid (i.e. a quadratic hypersurface). In particular, the osculating hyperellipsoid can be uniquely chosen so that it is centered at the origin, corresponding to the symmetric bilinear form $g_v$.

Strong convexity allows a well-behaved Legendre transformation between its tangent and cotangent spaces.

A Finsler metric is reversible if its balls are point-symmetric.

== Examples ==
Riemannian manifolds are special cases of Finsler manifolds, since their unit balls are hyperellipsoids that smoothly vary over space. More generally, smooth submanifolds (including open subsets) of a normed vector space of finite dimension are Finsler manifolds if the norm of the vector space is smooth outside the origin.

Pseudo-Riemannian manifolds are not Finsler, since their unit balls are hyperboloids, which are not bounded.

=== Randers manifolds ===
Let $(M, \alpha)$ be a Riemannian manifold and $\beta$ a differential one-form on M such that
$$\forall v \in T_x M \setminus\{0\}, \; \alpha(x)(v, v) > \beta(x)(v)^2$$
then

$$F(x, v) := \sqrt{\alpha(x)(v, v)} + \beta(x)(v)$$

defines a Randers metric, and $(M, F)$ is a Randers manifold. They are not reversible when $\beta \neq 0$. Unit balls of a Randers manifold are off-center ellipsoids.

Zermelo's navigation problem asks for the fastest path for a boat to go from point A to B on a flat ocean, when there is an ocean current velocity field. If the velocity field is smaller than the boat's maximum speed, then the geometry of the problem is a Randers manifold.

=== Kropina space ===
Let $(M, \alpha)$ be a Riemannian manifold and $\beta$ a differential one-form on M such that
$$\forall v \in T_x M \setminus\{0\}, \; \alpha(x)(v, v) > \beta(x)(v)^2$$
then

$$F(x, v) := \alpha(x)(v, v)/\beta(x)(v)$$

defines a Kropina space. Strictly speaking, it is not a Finsler geometry, because the unit balls are ellipsoids that are so off-center that the origins fall on their boundaries, meaning that $F(x, v)$ is only defined in an open half-space of $T_x M$. However, many concepts of Finsler geometry still apply to Kropina spaces. In Zermelo's navigation problem, this corresponds to the case where the ocean current is everywhere as fast as the boat's maximum speed.

=== (α, β)-Finsler manifolds ===
Let $(M, \alpha)$ be a Riemannian manifold and $\beta$ be a differential one-form on $M$ such that for all $x \in M$:

$$\forall v \in T_xM \setminus \{0\}, \quad \alpha(x)(v,v) > \beta(x)(v)^2.$$

If $\phi$ is a smooth positive function defined on an open interval containing $[-1, 1]$, then the function $F: TM \to [0, \infty)$ defined by:

$$F(x,v) = \alpha(x)(v,v) \phi\left( \frac{\beta(x)(v)}{\alpha(x)(v,v)} \right)$$

defines an (α, β)-metric. Both Randers ($\phi(s) = 1 + s$ ) and Kropina ($\phi(s) = 1/s$) spaces are special cases of (α, β)-metrics.

=== Smooth quasimetric spaces ===
Let (M, d) be a quasimetric so that M is also a differentiable manifold and d is compatible with the differential structure of M in the following sense:

- Around any point z on M there exists a smooth chart (U, φ) of M and a constant C ≥ 1 such that for every x, y ∈ U
  $$\frac{1}{C}\|\phi(y) - \phi(x)\| \leq d(x, y) \leq C\|\phi(y) - \phi(x)\|.$$
- The function d: M × M → [0, ∞] is smooth in some punctured neighborhood of the diagonal.

Then one can define a Finsler function F: TM →[0, ∞] by

$$F(x, v) := \lim_{t \to 0+} \frac{d(\gamma(0), \gamma(t))}{t},$$

where γ is any curve in M with γ(0) = x and γ'(0) = v. The Finsler function F obtained in this way restricts to an asymmetric (typically non-Minkowski) norm on each tangent space of M. The induced intrinsic metric d_{L}: M × M → [0, ∞] of the original quasimetric can be recovered from

$$d_L(x, y) := \inf\left\{\ \left.\int_0^1 F\left(\gamma(t), \dot\gamma(t)\right) \, dt \ \right| \ \gamma\in C^1([0, 1], M) \ , \ \gamma(0) = x \ , \ \gamma(1) = y \ \right\},$$

and in fact any Finsler function F: TM → [0, ∞) defines an intrinsic quasimetric d_{L} on M by this formula.

== Structures ==
Many structures in Riemannian geometry have counterparts in Finsler geometry.

=== Duality ===
Convex duality (or Legendre transformation) creates a bijection $T_x M \leftrightarrow T_x^* M$. For any unit-length $v \in T_x M$, construct the plane that is tangent to the unit ball at $v$. That is the convex dual $v^*$. Now extend this bijection by 1-homogeneity to a full bijection $T_x M \leftrightarrow T_x^* M$.

The convex dual of the unit ball is also strongly convex and contains the origin, thus defining a dual Finsler (or co-Finsler) metric $H$ on the cotangent bundle $T^* M$. Over a given manifold, the convex dual operation creates a bijection between the Finsler metrics and dual Finsler metrics that can be defined over the manifold.

=== Flatness ===
A Finsler space is locally projectively flat (aka locally projectively Euclidean, with rectilinear extremals, or with straight geodesics) iff there exists an atlas $\{U_i, \phi_i\}$, such that any geodesic in a coordinate chart $\gamma: I \to U_i$ is, in coordinates, of the form $t \mapsto f(t) \vec a + \vec b$ for some $\vec a, \vec b \in \R^n$ and some strictly monotonic $f: I \to \R$. It is globally projectively flat iff there exists a single coordinate system that makes it locally projectively flat around every point.

The question of flatness was first asked in the context of Hilbert's fourth problem.

=== Geodesics ===
Due to the homogeneity of F, the arc length

$$L[\gamma] := \int_a^b F\left(\gamma(t), \dot{\gamma}(t)\right)\, dt$$

of a differentiable curve γ: [a, b] → M in M is invariant under strictly positively monotonic reparametrizations. In particular, it allows the unit-speed (or arc length) parameterization. Note that since a Finsler manifold might not be reversible, the arc length is only well-defined for a directed differentiable curve.

A constant speed curve γ is a geodesic of a Finsler manifold if its short enough segments γ|_{[c,d]} are length-minimizing in M from γ(c) to γ(d). Equivalently, γ is a geodesic if it is stationary for the energy functional

$$E[\gamma] := \frac{1}{2}\int_a^b F^2\left(\gamma(t), \dot{\gamma}(t)\right)\, dt$$

in the sense that its functional derivative vanishes among differentiable curves γ: [a, b] → M with fixed endpoints γ(a) = x and γ(b) = y. This can be interpreted as a stationary action principle.

=== Geodesic flow ===
Along a unit-speed geodesic curve, the unit velocity vector is transported, creating the geodesic flow on the tangent bundle. Dually, the unit co-vector is also transported, creating the cogeodesic flow on the cotangent bundle.

As in the case of Riemannian geometry, at any point in any direction, there exists a unique geodesic going that way. Using unit-speed parametrization, it creates a transport of the unit-length tangent vector, which extends by 1-homogeneity to a transport of the tangent space. This is the geodesic flow on the tangent bundle. Taking the convex dual, it defines a cogeodesic flow on the cotangent bundle.

A version of the Huygens–Fresnel principle applies to the (co)geodesic flow. Specifically, the Finsler metric induces a contact 1-form on the space of unit-length tangent vectors, which by duality is a contact 1-form on the space of unit-length cotangent vectors. Then the (co)geodesic flow is the corresponding Reeb vector flow.

=== Geodesic spray ===
The geodesic flow is a flow on the tangent bundle $TM$. Equivalently, it is the flow of a section of the double tangent bundle $TTM$. This section of $TTM$ is the geodesic spray.

The Euler–Lagrange equation for the energy functional E[γ] reads in the local coordinates (x^{1}, ..., x^{n}, v^{1}, ..., v^{n}) of TM as

$$g_{ik}\Big(\gamma(t), \dot\gamma(t)\Big)\ddot\gamma^i(t) + \left(
\frac{\partial g_{ik}}{\partial x^j}\Big(\gamma(t), \dot\gamma(t)\Big) -
\frac{1}{2}\frac{\partial g_{ij}}{\partial x^k}\Big(\gamma(t), \dot\gamma(t)\Big)
\right) \dot\gamma^i(t)\dot\gamma^j(t) = 0,$$

where k = 1, ..., n and g_{ij} is the coordinate representation of the fundamental tensor, defined as

$$g_{ij}(x,v) := g_v\left(\left.\frac{\partial}{\partial x^i}\right|_x, \left.\frac{\partial}{\partial x^j}\right|_x\right).$$

Assuming the strong convexity of F^{2}(x, v) with respect to v ∈ T_{x}M, the matrix g_{ij}(x, v) is invertible and its inverse is denoted by g^{ij}(x, v). Then γ: [a, b] → M is a geodesic of (M, F) if and only if its tangent curve γ': [a, b] → TM∖{0} is an integral curve of the smooth vector field H on TM∖{0} locally defined by

$$\left.H\right|_{(x, v)} := \left.v^i\frac{\partial}{\partial x^i}\right|_{(x,v)}\!\! - \left.2G^i(x, v)\frac{\partial}{\partial v^i}\right|_{(x,v)},$$

where the local spray coefficients G^{i} are given by

$$G^i(x, v) := \frac{1}{4}g^{ij}(x, v)\left(2\frac{\partial g_{jk}}{\partial x^\ell}(x, v) - \frac{\partial g_{k\ell}}{\partial x^j}(x, v)\right)v^k v^\ell.$$

The vector field H on TM∖{0} satisfies JH = V and [V, H] = H, where J and V are the canonical endomorphism and the canonical vector field on TM∖{0}. Hence, by definition, H is a spray on M. The spray H defines a nonlinear connection on the fibre bundle TM∖{0} → M through the vertical projection

$$v: T(\mathrm{T}M \setminus \{0\}) \to T(\mathrm{T}M \setminus \{0\});\quad v := \frac{1}{2}\big(I + \mathcal{L}_H J\big).$$

In analogy with the Riemannian case, there is a version

$$D_{\dot\gamma}D_{\dot\gamma}X(t) + R_{\dot\gamma}\left(\dot\gamma(t), X(t)\right) = 0$$

of the Jacobi equation for a general spray structure (M, H) in terms of the Ehresmann curvature and nonlinear covariant derivative.

=== Uniqueness and minimizing properties of geodesics ===
By the Hopf–Rinow theorem, the manifold can be covered with open sets such that any two points in a set is connected by a unique length minimizing curve. Length minimizing curves can always be positively reparametrized to be geodesics, and any geodesic must satisfy the Euler–Lagrange equation for E[γ]. Assuming the strong convexity of F^{2} there exists a unique maximal geodesic γ with γ(0) = x and γ'(0) = v for any (x, v) ∈ TM∖{0} by the uniqueness of integral curves.

If F^{2} is strongly convex, geodesics γ: [0, b] → M are length-minimizing among nearby curves until the first point γ(s) conjugate to γ(0) along γ, and for t > s there always exist shorter curves from γ(0) to γ(t) near γ, as in the Riemannian case.

=== Connection ===
The geodesic flow determines how a path transports its own velocity vector. It does not determine how it transports other vectors. A Finsler connection extends it to a transport, by defining an Ehresmann connection on the double tangent bundle. This is not necessarily an affine connection, so the transport may be nonlinear.

Consequently, the covariant derivative may also be nonlinear. The curvature form is also defined.

== See also ==
- Banach manifold – Manifold modeled on Banach spaces
- Fréchet manifold – Topological space in mathematics
- Global analysis – which uses Hilbert manifolds and other kinds of infinite-dimensional manifolds
- Hilbert manifold – Manifold modelled on Hilbert spaces
