= Associated bundle =

Fiber bundle

In mathematics, the theory of fiber bundles with a structure group $G$ (a topological group) allows an operation of creating an associated bundle, in which the typical fiber of a bundle changes from $F_1$ to $F_2$, which are both topological spaces with a group action of $G$. For a fiber bundle $F$ with structure group $G$, the transition functions of the fiber (i.e., the cocycle) in an overlap of two coordinate systems $U_\alpha$ and $U_\beta$ are given as a $G$-valued function $g_{\alpha\beta}$ on $U_\alpha \cap U_\beta$. One may then construct a fiber bundle $F'$ as a new fiber bundle having the same transition functions, but possibly a different fiber.

== Construction ==
In general it is enough to explain the transition from a bundle with fiber $F$, on which $G$ acts, to the associated principal bundle (namely the bundle where the fiber is $G$, considered to act by translation on itself). For then we can go from $F_1$ to $F_2$, via the principal bundle. Details in terms of data for an open covering are given as a case of descent.

This section is organized as follows. We first introduce the general procedure for producing an associated bundle, with specified fiber, from a given fiber bundle. This then specializes to the case when the specified fiber is a principal homogeneous space for the left action of the group on itself, yielding the associated principal bundle. If, in addition, a right action is given on the fiber of the principal bundle, we describe how to construct any associated bundle by means of a fiber product construction.

=== Associated bundles in general ===
Let $\pi:E\to X$ be a fiber bundle over a topological space $X$ with structure group $G$ and typical fiber $F$. By definition, there is a left action of $G$ (as a transformation group) on the fiber $F$. Suppose furthermore that this action is faithful. There is a local trivialization of the bundle $E$ consisting of an open cover $U_i$ of $X$, and a collection of fiber maps
$$\varphi_i : \pi^{-1}(U_i) \to U_i \times F$$
such that the transition maps are given by elements of $G$. More precisely, there are continuous functions $g_{ij} \colon U_i \cap U_j \to G$ such that
$$\psi_{ij}(u,f) := \varphi_i \circ \varphi_j ^{-1}(u,f) = \big(u, g_{ij}(u) f \big),\quad
\text{for each } (u,f)\in (U_i \cap U_j)\times F\, .$$
This satisfies the cocycle condition:
$$g_{i j}(x) g_{j k}(x)=g_{i k}(x), \quad x \in U_i \cap U_j \cap U_k$$
Now let $F'$ be a specified topological space, equipped with a continuous left action of $G$. Then the bundle associated with $E$ with fiber $F'$ is a bundle $E'$ with a local trivialization subordinate to the cover $U_i$ whose transition functions are given by
$$\psi'_{ij}(u,f') = \big(u, g_{ij}(u) f' \big),\quad
\text{for each } (u,f')\in (U_i \cap U_j)\times F'\,,$$
where the $G$-valued functions $g_{ij}(u)$ are the same as those obtained from the local trivialization of the original bundle $E$. This definition clearly respects the cocycle condition on the transition functions, since the functions $\{g_{ij}\}_{i, j}$ satisfy the cocycle condition. Hence, by the existence part of the fiber bundle construction theorem, this produces a fiber bundle $E'$ with fiber $F'$, which is associated with $E$ as claimed.

=== Principal G-bundle associated with a G-bundle ===
As before, suppose that $E$ is a fiber bundle with structure group $G$. In the special case when $G$ has a free and transitive left action on $F'$, so that $F'$ is a principal homogeneous space for the left action of $G$ on itself, then the associated bundle $E'$ is called the principal $G$-bundle associated with the fiber bundle $E$. If, moreover, the new fiber $F'$ is identified with $G$ (so that $F'$ inherits a right action of $G$ as well as a left action), then the right action of $G$ on $F'$ induces a right action of $G$ on $E'$. With this choice of identification, $E'$ becomes a principal bundle in the usual sense.

By the isomorphism part of the fiber bundle construction theorem, the construction is unique up to isomorphism. That is, between any two constructions, there is a $G$-equivariant bundle isomorphism. This is also called a gauge transformation. This allows us to speak of the principal G-bundle associated with a G-bundle. In this way, a principal $G$-bundle equipped with a right action is often thought of as part of the data specifying a fiber bundle with structure group $G$. One may then, as in the next section, go the other way around and derive any fiber bundle by using a fiber product.

=== G-bundle associated with a principal G-bundle ===
Let $\pi \colon P \to X$ be a principal G-bundle. Given a faithful left action $\rho: G \to \operatorname{Homeo}(F)$ of $G$ on a fiber space $F$ (in the smooth category, we should have a smooth action on a smooth manifold), the goal is to construct a G-bundle $\pi_\rho : E \to X$ of the fiber space $F$ over the base space $X$ such that it is associated with $P$.

Define a right action of $G$ on $P \times F$ via

$$(p,f)\cdot g = (p\cdot g, g^{-1} \cdot f)\, .$$

Take the quotient of this action to obtain the space $E = P \times_\rho F = (P \times F) /G$. Denote the equivalence class of $(p, f)$ by $[p, f]$. Note that

$$[p\cdot g,f] = [p,g \cdot f] \mbox{ for all } g\in G.$$

Define a projection map $\pi_\rho \colon E \to X$ by $\pi_\rho([p, f]) = \pi(p)$. This is well-defined, since $\pi(p) = \pi(p \cdot g)$, i.e. the action of $G$ on $P$ preserves its fibers. Then $\pi_\rho \colon E \to X$ is a fiber bundle with fiber $F$ and structure group $G$, where the transition functions are given by $\rho \circ t_{ij}$, where $t_{ij}$ are the transition functions of the principal bundle $P$.

In category theory, this is the coequalizer construction. There are two continuous maps $P \times G \times F \to P \times F$, given by acting with $G$ on the right on $P$ and on the left on $F$. The associated fiber bundle $P \times_\rho F$ is the coequalizer of these maps.

== Examples ==
=== Möbius strip ===
Consider the Möbius strip, for which the structure group is $\mathbb{Z}_2$, the cyclic group of order 2. The fiber space $F$ can be any of the following: the real number line $\mathbb{R}$, the interval $[-1,\ 1]$, the real number line less the point 0, or the two-point set $\{-1,\ 1\}$. The non-identity element acts as $x\mapsto -x$ in each case.

These constructions, while different, are in some sense "basically the same" except for a change of fiber. We could say that more formally in terms of gluing two rectangles $[-1,\ 1] \times I$ and $[-1,\ 1] \times J$ together: what we really need is the data to identify $[-1,\ 1]$ to itself directly at one end, and with the twist over at the other end. This data can be written down as a transition function, with values in $G$. The associated bundle construction is just the observation that the only data that is relevant is how the transition function works on $\{-1,\ 1\}$. That is, for each G-bundle, the only essential part of it is the principal G-bundle associated with it, which encodes all of the transition data. Since their associated principal G-bundle are isomorphic, all these constructions of the Möbius strip are essentially the same construction.

=== Vector bundle ===
Given a vector bundle $E\to M$, with each fiber linearly isomorphic to $V$, we can define the associated frame bundle $F \to M$, where each fiber $F_x$ is the set of linear transformations of type $V \to E_x$. That is, we define $F_x := \mathrm{Hom}_{\mathrm{LinAlg}}(V, E_x)$.

This $F_x$ has the structure of a $GL(V)$-torsor, acting on the right. The whole associated frame bundle is then a $GL(V)$ principal bundle.

== Extension of the structure group ==
Given a subgroup $H \subset G$ and a $H$-bundle $C$, then it can be extended to a $G$-bundle $B$. Intuitively, the extension is obtained by taking a twisted sum of $C$, one per coset of $H$ in $G$.

In detail, define
$$\operatorname{Ext}(C):=C \times_H G=(C \times G) / \sim, \quad(p, g) \sim\left(p \cdot h, h^{-1} g\right) .$$
Then $\operatorname{Ext}(C) \rightarrow X$ is a $G$-bundle with right $G$-action
$$[p, g] \cdot g^{\prime}=\left[p, g g^{\prime}\right] .$$
This is well defined. Moreover, if $C$ is a principal $H$-bundle, then $\operatorname{Ext}(C)$ is a principal $G$-bundle. If $C$ has transition functions $h_{i j}: U_i \cap U_j \rightarrow H$, then $\operatorname{Ext}(C)$ has transition functions $i \circ h_{i j}: U_i \cap U_j \rightarrow G$ where $i : H \to G$ is the inclusion function.

The extension always exists, is functorial, and unique up to isomorphism.

More generally, extension is possible given a continuous (smooth) homomorphism $\varphi: H \rightarrow G$. The previous case is the special case where $\varphi$ is the inclusion function.

Take the contracted product
$$\operatorname{Ext}_{\varphi}(C):=C \times_H G=(C \times G) /\left((p, g) \sim\left(p \cdot h, \varphi(h)^{-1} g\right)\right) .$$
with the action
$$[p, g] \cdot g^{\prime}=\left[p, g g^{\prime}\right] .$$
The transition functions are of the form $g_{i j}=\varphi \circ h_{i j}$.

This construction is functorial and has a universal property: any $H$-equivariant map $F: C \rightarrow Q$ into a principal $G$-bundle $Q$ with $F(p h)=F(p) \cdot \varphi(h)$ factors uniquely through a $G$-bundle morphism $\operatorname{Ext}_{\varphi}(C) \rightarrow Q$. In particular, the construction of $C \times_H G$ is unique up to unique isomorphism.

== Reduction of the structure group ==
Reduction of the structure group asks whether there is an inverse to the extension.

Given a $G$-bundle $B$ and a subgroup $H \subset G$ of the structure group, we ask whether there is an $H$-bundle $C$, such that after extending the structure group to $G$, then constructing the associated $G$-bundle, we recover $B$ up to isomorphism. More concretely, this asks whether the transition data for $B$ can consistently be written with values in $H$. In other words, we ask to identify the image of the associated bundle mapping (which is actually a functor).

Unlike the case of extension, reduction is not always possible. A goal of obstruction theory is to explain when and how reduction may be impossible.

=== Examples ===
If $H \subset G$, then a $H$-bundle $C$ can be extended to a $G$-bundle $B$, after which the reduction to $H$ is just $C$ again.

Given a smooth manifold, its frame bundle is a principal general linear group $\mathrm{GL}(n)$-bundle. Many geometric structures over a smooth manifold are then naturally expressed as reductions of $\mathrm{GL}(n)$. A Riemannian metric is a reduction of the structure group to the orthogonal group $\mathrm{O}(n)$. An orientation is a reduction to the special linear group $\mathrm{SL}(n)$.

Given a smooth manifold, its tangent bundle, or more generally, a vector bundle of rank $n$ over it, is also a principal $\mathrm{GL}(n)$-bundle, and we can perform similar reductions. An almost complex structure on a real bundle is a reduction of the structure group from real general linear group $\mathrm{GL}(2n, \mathbb{R})$ to the complex general linear group $\mathrm{GL}(n, \mathbb{C})$. Decomposing a vector bundle of rank $n$ as a Whitney sum (direct sum) of sub-bundles of rank $k$ and $n-k$ is reducing the structure group from $\mathrm{GL}(n, \mathbb{R})$ to $\mathrm{GL}(k, \mathbb{R}) \times \mathrm{GL}(n-k, \mathbb{R})$. Extra integrability conditions are necessary for it to make it a "complex" structure, not merely "almost complex".

A distribution on a manifold is a reduction of its tangent bundle to a block matrix subgroup. In detail, a $p$-dimensional distribution on an $n$-manifold $M$ is a reduction of the frame bundle $T M$ from $\operatorname{GL}(n)$ to the subgroup that preserves a fixed $p$-plane in $\mathbb{R}^n$ (i.e. a flag $0 \subset \mathbb{R}^p \subset \mathbb{R}^n$):
$$G_{p, q}=\left\{\left(\begin{array}{cc}
A & B \\
0 & C
\end{array}\right): A \in \mathrm{GL}(p, \mathbb{R}), C \in \mathrm{GL}(q, \mathbb{R}), B \in M_{p \times q}(\mathbb{R})\right\}, \quad q=n-p$$
When the distribution is integrable, Frobenius theorem applies, producing a foliation.

== See also ==
- Spinor bundle

== Books ==
- Steenrod, Norman (1951). The Topology of Fibre Bundles. Princeton: Princeton University Press. ISBN 0-691-00548-6.
- Husemoller, Dale (1994). Fibre Bundles (Third ed.). New York: Springer. ISBN 978-0-387-94087-8.
- Sharpe, R. W. (1997). Differential Geometry: Cartan's Generalization of Klein's Erlangen Program. New York: Springer. ISBN 0-387-94732-9.
