= Tangent bundle =

Tangent spaces of a manifold

Informally, the tangent bundle of a manifold (which in this case is a circle) is obtained by considering all the tangent spaces (top), and joining them together in a smooth and non-overlapping manner (bottom). (Note: The disjoint union ensures that for any two points x_{1} and x_{2} of manifold M the tangent spaces T_{1} and T_{2} have no common vector. This is graphically illustrated in the accompanying picture for tangent bundle of circle S^{1}, see Examples section: all tangents to a circle lie in the plane of the circle. In order to make them disjoint it is necessary to align them in a plane perpendicular to the plane of the circle.)

A tangent bundle is the collection of all of the tangent spaces for all points on a manifold, structured in a way that it forms a new manifold itself. Formally, in differential geometry, the tangent bundle of a differentiable manifold $M$ is a manifold $TM$ which assembles all the tangent vectors in $M$. As a set, it is given by the disjoint union of the tangent spaces of $M$. That is,

$$\begin{align}
TM &= \bigsqcup_{x \in M} T_xM \\
&= \bigcup_{x \in M} \left\{x\right\} \times T_xM \\
&= \bigcup_{x \in M} \left\{(x, y) \mid y \in T_xM\right\} \\
&= \left\{ (x, y) \mid x \in M,\, y \in T_xM \right\}
\end{align}$$

where $T_x M$ denotes the tangent space to $M$ at the point $x$. So, an element of $TM$ can be thought of as a pair $(x,v)$, where $x$ is a point in $M$ and $v$ is a tangent vector to $M$ at $x$.

There is a natural projection

$$\pi : TM \twoheadrightarrow M$$

defined by $\pi(x, v) = x$. This projection maps each element of the tangent space $T_xM$ to the single point $x$.

The tangent bundle comes equipped with a natural topology (described in a section below). With this topology, the tangent bundle to a manifold is the prototypical example of a vector bundle (which is a fiber bundle whose fibers are vector spaces). A section of $TM$ is a vector field on $M$, and the dual bundle to $TM$ is the cotangent bundle, which is the disjoint union of the cotangent spaces of $M$. By definition, a manifold $M$ is parallelizable if and only if the tangent bundle is trivial. By definition, a manifold $M$ is framed if and only if the tangent bundle $TM$ is stably trivial, meaning that for some trivial bundle $E$ the Whitney sum $TM\oplus E$ is trivial. For example, the n-dimensional sphere S^{n} is framed for all n, but parallelizable only for n = 1, 3, 7 (by results of Bott-Milnor and Kervaire).

== Role ==
One of the main roles of the tangent bundle is to provide a domain and range for the derivative of a smooth function. Namely, if $f:M\rightarrow N$ is a smooth function, with $M$ and $N$ smooth manifolds, its derivative is a smooth function $Df:TM\rightarrow TN$.

== Topology and smooth structure ==
The tangent bundle comes equipped with a natural topology (not the disjoint union topology) and smooth structure so as to make it into a manifold in its own right. The dimension of $TM$ is twice the dimension of $M$.

Each tangent space of an n-dimensional manifold is an n-dimensional vector space. If $U$ is an open contractible subset of $M$, then there is a diffeomorphism $TU\to U\times\mathbb R^n$ which restricts to a linear isomorphism from each tangent space $T_xU$ to $\{x\}\times\mathbb R^n$. As a manifold, however, $TM$ is not always diffeomorphic to the product manifold $M\times\mathbb R^n$. When it is of the form $M\times\mathbb R^n$, then the tangent bundle is said to be trivial. Trivial tangent bundles usually occur for manifolds equipped with a 'compatible group structure'; for instance, in the case where the manifold is a Lie group. The tangent bundle of the unit circle is trivial because it is a Lie group (under multiplication and its natural differential structure). It is not true however that all spaces with trivial tangent bundles are Lie groups; manifolds which have a trivial tangent bundle are called parallelizable. Just as manifolds are locally modeled on Euclidean space, tangent bundles are locally modeled on $U\times\mathbb R^n$, where $U$ is an open subset of Euclidean space.

If M is a smooth n-dimensional manifold, then it comes equipped with an atlas of charts $(U_\alpha,\phi_\alpha)$, where $U_\alpha$ is an open set in $M$ and

$$\phi_\alpha: U_\alpha \to \mathbb R^n$$

is a diffeomorphism. These local coordinates on $U_\alpha$ give rise to an isomorphism $T_xM\rightarrow\mathbb R^n$ for all $x\in U_\alpha$. We may then define a map

$$\widetilde\phi_\alpha:\pi^{-1}\left(U_\alpha\right) \to \mathbb R^{2n}$$

by

$$\widetilde\phi_\alpha\left(x, v^i\partial_i\right) = \left(\phi_\alpha(x), v^1, \cdots, v^n\right)$$

We use these maps to define the topology and smooth structure on $TM$. A subset $A$ of $TM$ is open if and only if

$$\widetilde\phi_\alpha\left(A\cap \pi^{-1}\left(U_\alpha\right)\right)$$

is open in $\mathbb R^{2n}$ for each $\alpha.$ These maps are homeomorphisms between open subsets of $TM$ and $\mathbb R^{2n}$ and therefore serve as charts for the smooth structure on $TM$. The transition functions on chart overlaps $\pi^{-1}\left(U_\alpha \cap U_\beta\right)$ are induced by the Jacobian matrices of the associated coordinate transformation and are therefore smooth maps between open subsets of $\mathbb R^{2n}$.

The tangent bundle is an example of a more general construction called a vector bundle (which is itself a specific kind of fiber bundle). Explicitly, the tangent bundle to an $n$-dimensional manifold $M$ may be defined as a rank $n$ vector bundle over $M$ whose transition functions are given by the Jacobian of the associated coordinate transformations.

== Examples ==
The simplest example is that of $\mathbb R^n$. In this case the tangent bundle is trivial: each $T_x \mathbf \mathbb R^n$ is canonically isomorphic to $T_\mathbf{0} \mathbb R^n$ via the map $\mathbb R^n \to \mathbb R^n$ which subtracts $x$, giving a diffeomorphism $T\mathbb R^n \to \mathbb R^n \times \mathbb R^n$.

Another simple example is the unit circle, $S^1$ (see picture above). The tangent bundle of the circle is also trivial and isomorphic to $S^1\times\mathbb R$. Geometrically, this is a cylinder of infinite height.

The only tangent bundles that can be readily visualized are those of the real line $\mathbb R$ and the unit circle $S^1$, both of which are trivial. For 2-dimensional manifolds the tangent bundle is 4-dimensional and hence difficult to visualize.

A simple example of a nontrivial tangent bundle is that of the unit sphere $S^2$: this tangent bundle is nontrivial as a consequence of the hairy ball theorem. Therefore, the sphere is not parallelizable.

== Vector fields ==
A smooth assignment of a tangent vector to each point of a manifold is called a vector field. Specifically, a vector field on a manifold $M$ is a smooth map

$$V\colon M \to TM$$

such that $V(x) = (x,V_x)$ with $V_x\in T_xM$ for every $x\in M$. In the language of fiber bundles, such a map is called a section. A vector field on $M$ is therefore a section of the tangent bundle of $M$.

The set of all vector fields on $M$ is denoted by $\Gamma(TM)$. Vector fields can be added together pointwise

$$(V+W)_x = V_x + W_x$$

and multiplied by smooth functions on M

$$(fV)_x = f(x)V_x$$

to get other vector fields. The set of all vector fields $\Gamma(TM)$ then takes on the structure of a module over the commutative algebra of smooth functions on M, denoted $C^{\infty}(M)$.

A local vector field on $M$ is a local section of the tangent bundle. That is, a local vector field is defined only on some open set $U\subset M$ and assigns to each point of $U$ a vector in the associated tangent space. The set of local vector fields on $M$ forms a structure known as a sheaf of real vector spaces on $M$.

The above construction applies equally well to the cotangent bundle – the differential 1-forms on $M$ are precisely the sections of the cotangent bundle $\omega \in \Gamma(T^*M)$, $\omega: M \to T^*M$ that associate to each point $x \in M$ a 1-covector $\omega_x \in T^*_xM$, which map tangent vectors to real numbers: $\omega_x : T_xM \to \R$. Equivalently, a differential 1-form $\omega \in \Gamma(T^*M)$ maps a smooth vector field $X \in \Gamma(TM)$ to a smooth function $\omega(X) \in C^{\infty}(M)$.

== Higher-order tangent bundles ==
Since the tangent bundle $TM$ is itself a smooth manifold, the second-order tangent bundle can be defined via repeated application of the tangent bundle construction:

$T^2 M = T(TM).\,$

In general, the $k$th order tangent bundle $T^k M$ can be defined recursively as $T\left(T^{k-1}M\right)$.

A smooth map $f: M \rightarrow N$ has an induced derivative, for which the tangent bundle is the appropriate domain and range $Df : TM \rightarrow TN$. Similarly, higher-order tangent bundles provide the domain and range for higher-order derivatives $D^k f : T^k M \to T^k N$.

A distinct but related construction are the jet bundles on a manifold, which are bundles consisting of jets.

== Canonical vector field on tangent bundle ==
On every tangent bundle $TM$, considered as a manifold itself, one can define a canonical vector field $V:TM\rightarrow T^2M$ as the diagonal map on the tangent space at each point. This is possible because the tangent space of a vector space W is naturally a product, $TW \cong W \times W,$ since the vector space itself is flat, and thus has a natural diagonal map $W \to TW$ given by $w \mapsto (w, w)$ under this product structure. Applying this product structure to the tangent space at each point and globalizing yields the canonical vector field. Informally, although the manifold $M$ is curved, each tangent space at a point $x$, $T_x M \approx \mathbb{R}^n$, is flat, so the tangent bundle manifold $TM$ is locally a product of a curved $M$ and a flat $\mathbb{R}^n.$ Thus the tangent bundle of the tangent bundle is locally (using $\approx$ for "choice of coordinates" and $\cong$ for "natural identification"):

$$T(TM) \approx T(M \times \mathbb{R}^n) \cong TM \times T(\mathbb{R}^n)  \cong TM \times (  \mathbb{R}^n\times\mathbb{R}^n)$$

and the map $TTM \to TM$ is the projection onto the first coordinates:

$$(TM \to M) \times (\mathbb{R}^n \times \mathbb{R}^n \to \mathbb{R}^n).$$

Splitting the first map via the zero section and the second map by the diagonal yields the canonical vector field.

If $(x,v)$ are local coordinates for $TM$, the vector field has the expression

$$V = \sum_i \left. v^i \frac{\partial}{\partial v^i} \right|_{(x,v)}.$$

More concisely, $(x, v) \mapsto (x, v, 0, v)$ – the first pair of coordinates do not change because it is the section of a bundle and these are just the point in the base space: the last pair of coordinates are the section itself. This expression for the vector field depends only on $v$, not on $x$, as only the tangent directions can be naturally identified.

Alternatively, consider the scalar multiplication function:

$$\begin{cases}
\mathbb{R} \times TM \to TM \\
(t,v) \longmapsto tv
\end{cases}$$

The derivative of this function with respect to the variable $\mathbb R$ at time $t=1$ is a function $V:TM\rightarrow T^2M$, which is an alternative description of the canonical vector field.

The existence of such a vector field on $TM$ is analogous to the canonical one-form on the cotangent bundle. Sometimes $V$ is also called the Liouville vector field, or radial vector field. Using $V$ one can characterize the tangent bundle. Essentially, $V$ can be characterized using 4 axioms, and if a manifold has a vector field satisfying these axioms, then the manifold is a tangent bundle and the vector field is the canonical vector field on it. See for example, De León et al.

== Lifts ==
There are various ways to lift objects on $M$ into objects on $TM$. For example, if $\gamma$ is a curve in $M$, then $\gamma'$ (the tangent of $\gamma$) is a curve in $TM$. In contrast, without further assumptions on $M$ (say, a Riemannian metric), there is no similar lift into the cotangent bundle.

The vertical lift of a function $f:M\rightarrow\mathbb R$ is the function $f^\vee:TM\rightarrow\mathbb R$ defined by $f^\vee=f\circ \pi$, where $\pi:TM\rightarrow M$ is the canonical projection.

== See also ==
- Pushforward (differential)
- Unit tangent bundle
- Cotangent bundle
- Frame bundle
- Musical isomorphism
- Holomorphic tangent bundle
