= Levi-Civita =

Levi-Civita may also refer to:

- Tullio Levi-Civita, Italian mathematician
  - Levi-Civita connection, the unique affine connection on the tangent bundle of a manifold that preserves the (pseudo-)Riemannian metric and is torsion-free
  - Levi-Civita field, a non-Archimedean ordered field
  - Levi-Civita parallelogramoid, a quadrilateral in a curved space whose construction generalizes that of a parallelogram in the Euclidean plane
  - Levi-Civita symbol, a collection of numbers defined from the sign of a permutation of the natural numbers 1, 2, ..., n, for some positive integer n
  - Levi-Civita regularization, a method to avoid singularities in classical mechanics
  - Levi-Civita (crater), a lunar impact crater formation that lies on the far side of the Moon
- Libera Trevisani Levi-Civita, Italian mathematician, wife of Tullio Levi-Civita
