= Arthur Geoffrey Walker =

British mathematician (1909–2001)

- Born: 17 July 1909; Watford, Hertfordshire, England
- Died: 31 March 2001 (aged 91); West Chiltington, Sussex, England
- Education: Balliol College, Oxford; Merton College, Oxford; University of Edinburgh
- Known for: Friedmann–Lemaître–Robertson–Walker metric Fermi–Walker transport
- Spouse: Phyllis Ashcroft Freeman (m. 1939)
- Scientific career
- Fields: Mathematical physics
- Workplaces: University of Sheffield
- Doctoral advisor: Edmund Taylor Whittaker

Arthur Geoffrey Walker FRS FRSE (17 July 1909 in Watford, Hertfordshire, England – 31 March 2001) was a British mathematician and professor of the University of Sheffield who made important contributions to physical cosmology. Although he was an accomplished geometer, he is best remembered today for two important contributions to general relativity, namely, the Robertson–Walker metric and the Fermi–Walker transport.

== Early life ==
He was born in Watford on 17 July 1909 the son of Arthur John Walker (b.1879), a coach builder, and his wife, Eleanor Joanna Gosling.

Walker attended Watford Grammar School for Boys and won a scholarship to Balliol College, Oxford, where he graduated with first class honours in Mathematics. He then studied at Merton College, Oxford. He then went as a postgraduate to University of Edinburgh, studying for his doctorate (PhD) under Professor Edmund Taylor Whittaker. Professor Arthur Stanley Eddington was his external examiner. His exposure to differential geometry, general relativity, and cosmology created the background for his future work.

== Academic career ==
Luther Pfahler Eisenhart's 1926 text, Riemannian Geometry, proved to a great influence on Walker, who referred to it as his "Bible" and cited it in many of his papers. The notion of parallel transport was introduced by Tullio Levi-Civita and again by Enrico Fermi, who also applied it to world lines in spacetime. In 1932, Walker developed this idea further, creating the technique of parallel transport for a tensor. The Fermi-Walker transport is now of common use in general relativity.

Walker took up a post as Lecturer at Imperial College in 1935; the following year he was appointed as Lecturer in Pure Mathematics at the University of Liverpool, a post he held until 1947, when he moved to the University of Sheffield as Professor of Pure Mathematics. In 1935, Walker and Robertson demonstrated that the isotropic and homogeneous cosmological models previously constructed by Georges Lemaître and Alexander Friedmann all shared the same general form, the Robertson-Walker metric. They also showed that this was the most general model possible that featured isotropy and homogeneity (see the Copernican principle). During the mid 1930s, he collaborated with the Department of Mechanical Engineering on problems involving tidal flow.

In 1946 he was elected a Fellow of the Royal Society of Edinburgh. His proposers were Harold Stanley Ruse, Sir Edmund Taylor Whittaker, David Gibb and William Edge. He won the Society's Keith Medal for the period 1947/49.

In 1952 he returned to Liverpool University, in 1962 becoming Dean of its Faculty of Science. Having been elected a Fellow of the Royal Society in 1955, he served as a member of the organisation's council from 1961 to 1962. He served as president of the London Mathematical Society from 1962 to 1963. Walker retired from Liverpool University in 1974.

== Publications ==
- Harmonic Spaces (1962)
- An Introduction to Geometrical Cosmology (1975)

== Awards and honours ==
- Fellow of the Royal Astronomical Society, 1934
- Fellow of the Royal Society of Edinburgh, 1946
- Berwick Prize, 1947
- Keith Medal, 1947-9
- Fellow of the Royal Society, 1955

== Personal life ==
Walker married Phyllis Ashcroft Freeman in 1939; the couple were accomplished ballroom dancers. He died in Chichester on 31 March 2001, aged 91.
