= Paul Kustaanheimo =

Finnish mathematician and astronomer (1924–1997)

- Born: Paul Edwin Gustavsson; 12 April 1924; Turku, Finland
- Died: 24 August 1997 (aged 73) near Lyngby, Denmark
- Citizenship: Denmark; Finland
- Education: University of Helsinki
- Known for: Kustaanheimo–Stiefel regularization
- Scientific career
- Fields: Celestial mechanics, general relativity, finite geometry
- Workplaces: University of Helsinki; Academy of Finland

Paul Edwin Kustaanheimo (born Gustavsson; 12 April 1924 – 24 August 1997) was a Finnish mathematician and astronomer. He held three successive chairs at the University of Helsinki before moving to Denmark in the mid-1970s, and published on celestial mechanics, general relativity and finite geometry. He is remembered chiefly for the Kustaanheimo–Stiefel regularization.

== Career ==
Kustaanheimo was born in Turku and read mathematics, astronomy and physics at the University of Helsinki between 1941 and 1950, completing a doctorate in mathematics in the latter year and qualifying as a docent in 1951. He joined the staff of the university observatory in 1945 and served there as observator from 1952 until 1958.

A post as associate professor of mathematics followed in 1958. Kustaanheimo moved to the chair of applied mathematics in 1964 and, on the retirement of Gustaf Järnefelt, to the chair of astronomy in 1969, which carried with it the directorship of the observatory. Students and staff responded to the appointment by occupying the observatory; Kustaanheimo took leave of absence, worked as a research professor of the Academy of Finland in the first half of the 1970s, and gave up the chair in 1977. He settled in Denmark in 1976 and taught mathematics at Lyngby, outside Copenhagen, until 1989. Kustaanheimo acquired Danish citizenship. He died at his home near Lyngby on 24 August 1997.

== Research ==
Between 1949 and 1957 Kustaanheimo belonged to a Helsinki circle, Järnefelt among them, that substituted finite Galois fields for the real numbers in order to construct discrete counterparts of Euclidean plane geometry and to ask whether physical space might be described in such terms; his contribution of 1951 showed that only some finite fields yield workable models. A paper of 1948 written with Bertil Qvist on spherically symmetric solutions of the Einstein field equations was later republished in the "Golden Oldies" series of General Relativity and Gravitation.

Tullio Levi-Civita had removed the singularity that the Kepler problem develops as two bodies approach one another, but only in the plane. Kustaanheimo put forward a preliminary treatment of the three-dimensional case in spinor form in 1964, and the theory was completed in a paper written jointly with Eduard Stiefel the following year. The resulting transformation converts the perturbed Kepler problem into a harmonic oscillator in four dimensions and is applied in celestial mechanics where close encounters make the equations of motion hard to integrate numerically.

== Recognition ==
The asteroid 1559 Kustaanheimo, found by Liisi Oterma in 1942, bears his name; the naming citation appeared in the Minor Planet Circulars on 20 February 1976.

== Selected publications ==
- Kustaanheimo, Paul (1951). "A note on a finite approximation of the Euclidean plane geometry". Societas Scientiarum Fennica, Commentationes Physico-Mathematicae. 15 (19): 1–11.
- Kustaanheimo, Paul (1964). "Spinor regularisation of the Kepler motion". Annales Universitatis Turkuensis, Series A. 73: 1–7.
- Nevanlinna, Rolf; Kustaanheimo, Paul (1976). Grundlagen der Geometrie. Basel: Birkhäuser.
