= 1558 Järnefelt =

Main-belt asteroid

Discovery
- Discovered by: L. Oterma
- Discovery site: Turku Obs.
- Discovery date: 20 January 1942

Designations
- Named after: Gustaf Järnefelt (Finnish astronomer)
- Alternative designations: 1942 BD · 1929 WD_{1} 1934 VX · 1937 EF; 1943 GQ · 1951 RC_{2} 1972 BO · A913 AA
- Minor planet category: main-belt · (outer)

Orbital characteristics
- Epoch 4 September 2017 (JD 2458000.5)
- Uncertainty parameter 0
- Observation arc: 104.22 yr (38,068 days)
- Aphelion: 3.3244 AU
- Perihelion: 3.1208 AU
- Semi-major axis: 3.2226 AU
- Eccentricity: 0.0316
- Orbital period (sidereal): 5.79 yr (2,113 days)
- Mean anomaly: 105.25°
- Mean motion: 0° 10^{m} 13.44^{s} / day
- Inclination: 10.489°
- Longitude of ascending node: 110.93°
- Argument of perihelion: 291.23°

Physical characteristics
- Dimensions: 54.98±0.56 km 61.77±0.70 km 65.05 km (derived); 65.09±7.1 km (IRAS:6)
- Synodic rotation period: 18.22±0.06 h
- Geometric albedo: 0.0317 (derived); 0.0347±0.009 (IRAS:6); 0.039±0.001; 0.049±0.008
- Spectral type: C
- Absolute magnitude (H): 10.2 · 10.28±0.36 · 10.3

1558 Järnefelt (provisional designation 1942 BD) is a carbonaceous asteroid from the outer region of the asteroid belt, approximately 65 kilometers in diameter. It was discovered on 20 January 1942, by Finnish astronomer Liisi Oterma at Turku Observatory in Southwest Finland, and later named for Finnish astronomer Gustaf Järnefelt (1901–1989).

== Classification and orbit ==
The dark C-type asteroid is not a member of any known asteroid family. It orbits the Sun in the outer main-belt at a distance of 3.1–3.3 AU once every 5 years and 9 months (2,113 days). Its orbit has an eccentricity of 0.03 and an inclination of 10° with respect to the ecliptic. Järnefelt was first identified as A913 AA at Heidelberg in 1913. Its first used observation was made at Johannesburg Observatory in 1934, extending the body's observation arc by 8 years prior to its official discovery observation.

== Lightcurve ==
In May 2007, a fragmentary rotational lightcurve of Järnefelt was obtained from photometric observations at the U.S. Oakley Observatory, Indiana. It gave a rotation period of 18.22 hours with a brightness variation of 0.40 in magnitude. This was the first time the asteroid's period had been measured. However, the lightcurve is not fully covered by the 90 data points obtained, so the period may be wrong by about 30 percent (U=2).

== Diameter and albedo ==
According to the space-based surveys carried out by the Infrared Astronomical Satellite (IRAS), the Japanese Akari satellite, and NASA's Wide-field Infrared Survey Explorer with its subsequent NEOWISE mission, the asteroid has an albedo of 0.034 to 0.049, and an estimated diameter between 55.0 and 65.1 kilometers. The Collaborative Asteroid Lightcurve Link agrees with the data obtained by IRAS and derives an albedo of 0.032 and a diameter of 65.1 kilometers, based on an absolute magnitude of 10.3.

== Naming ==
This minor planet was named after Gustaf J. Järnefelt (1901–1989), a Finnish mathematician and astronomer, who was the director of the Helsinki University Observatory and professor of astronomy at the University of Helsinki from 1945 until 1969, when he was succeeded by Paul Kustaanheimo (see 1559 Kustaanheimo). His research included the theory of relativity and the publication artificial satellite observations. The official naming citation was published by the Minor Planet Center on 20 February 1976 (M.P.C. 3930).
