= Segre's theorem =

Theorem in projective geometry

to the definition of a finite oval: $t$ tangent, $s_1,...s_n$ secants, $n$ is the order of the projective plane (number of points on a line -1)

In projective geometry, Segre's theorem, named after the Italian mathematician Beniamino Segre, is the statement:

- Any oval in a finite pappian projective plane of odd order is a nondegenerate projective conic section.

This statement was assumed 1949 by the two Finnish mathematicians G. Järnefelt and P. Kustaanheimo and its proof was published in 1955 by B. Segre.

A finite pappian projective plane can be imagined as the projective closure of the real plane (by a line at infinity), where the real numbers are replaced by a finite field K. Odd order means that |K| = n is odd. An oval is a curve similar to a circle (see definition below): any line meets it in at most 2 points and through any point of it there is exactly one tangent. The standard examples are the nondegenerate projective conic sections.

In pappian projective planes of even order greater than four there are ovals which are not conics. In an infinite plane there exist ovals, which are not conics. In the real plane one just glues a half of a circle and a suitable ellipse smoothly.

The proof of Segre's theorem, shown below, uses the 3-point version of Pascal's theorem and a property of a finite field of odd order, namely, that the product of all the nonzero elements equals -1.

== Definition of an oval ==
- In a projective plane a set $\mathfrak o$ of points is called oval, if:

(1) Any line $g$ meets $\mathfrak o$ in at most two points.

If $|g\cap\mathfrak o|=0$ the line $g$ is an exterior (or passing) line; in case $|g\cap\mathfrak o|=1$ a tangent line and if $|g\cap\mathfrak o|=2$ the line is a secant line.

(2) For any point $P \in \mathfrak o$ there exists exactly one tangent $t$ at P, i.e., $t\cap\mathfrak o=\{P\}$.

For finite planes (i.e. the set of points is finite) we have a more convenient characterization:

- For a finite projective plane of order n (i.e. any line contains n + 1 points) a set $\mathfrak o$ of points is an oval if and only if $|\mathfrak o|=n+1$ and no three points are collinear (on a common line).

== Pascal's 3-point version ==
for the proof $g_\infty$ is the tangent at $P_3$

Theorem

Let be $\mathfrak o$ an oval in a pappian projective plane of characteristic $\ne 2$.
$\mathfrak o$ is a nondegenerate conic if and only if statement (P3) holds:

(P3): Let be $P_1,P_2,P_3$ any triangle on $\mathfrak o$ and $\overline {P_iP_i}$ the tangent at point $P_i$ to $\mathfrak o$, then the points

$$P_4:= \overline {P_1P_1} \cap \overline {P_2P_3},\  P_5:= \overline {P_2P_2} \cap \overline {P_1P_3}, \ P_6:= \overline {P_3P_3} \cap \overline {P_1P_2}$$
are collinear.

to the proof of the 3-point Pascal theorem

Proof

Let the projective plane be coordinatized inhomogeneously over a field $K$ such that $P_3=(0), \; g_\infty$ is the tangent at $P_3 , \ (0,0) \in \mathfrak o$, the x-axis is the tangent at the point $(0,0)$ and $\mathfrak o$ contains the point $(1,1)$. Furthermore, we set $P_1=(x_1,y_1), \; P_2=(x_2,y_2)\ .$ (s. image)
The oval $\mathfrak o$ can be described by a function $f: K \mapsto K$ such that:

$$\mathfrak o=\{(x,y)\in K^2 \;|\; y=f(x)\} \ \cup \{(\infty)\}\; .$$

The tangent at point $(x_0,f(x_0))$ will be described using a function $f'$ such that its equation is

$$y=f'(x_0)(x-x_0) +f(x_0)$$

Hence (s. image)

$P_5=(x_1,f'(x_2)(x_1-x_2)+f(x_2))$ and $P_4=(x_2,f'(x_1)(x_2-x_1)+f(x_1))\; .$

I: if $\mathfrak o$ is a non degenerate conic we have $f(x)=x^2$ and $f'(x)=2x$ and one calculates easily that $P_4,P_5,P_6$ are collinear.

II: If $\mathfrak o$ is an oval with property (P3), the slope of the line $\overline{P_4P_5}$ is equal to the slope of the line $\overline{P_1P_2}$, that means:

$f'(x_2)+f'(x_1) - \frac{f(x_2)-f(x_1)}{x_2-x_1}=\frac{f(x_2)-f(x_1)}{x_2-x_1}$ and hence
(i): $(f'(x_2)+f'(x_1))(x_2-x_1)=2(f(x_2)-f(x_1))$ for all $x_1,x_2 \in K$.

With $f(0)=f'(0)=0$ one gets

(ii): $f'(x_2)x_2=2f(x_2)$ and from $f(1)=1$ we get
(iii): $f'(1)=2 \; .$

(i) and (ii) yield

(iv): $f'(x_2)x_1=f'(x_1)x_2$ and with (iii) at least we get
(v): $f'(x_2)=2x_2$ for all $x_2 \in K$.

A consequence of (ii) and (v) is

$$f(x_2)=x_2^2, \; x_2 \in K$$.

Hence $\mathfrak o$ is a nondegenerate conic.

Remark: Property (P3) is fulfilled for any oval in a pappian projective plane of characteristic 2 with a nucleus (all tangents meet at the nucleus). Hence in this case (P3) is also true for non-conic ovals.

== Segre's theorem and its proof ==
Theorem

Any oval $\mathfrak o$ in a finite pappian projective plane of odd order is a nondegenerate conic section.

3-point version of Pascal's theorem, for the proof we assume $g_\infty=\overline{P_2P_3}$

Segre's theorem: to its proof

Proof

For the proof we show that the oval has property (P3) of the 3-point version of Pascal's theorem.

Let be $P_1,P_2,P_3$ any triangle on $\mathfrak o$ and $P_4,P_5,P_6$ defined as described in (P3). The pappian plane will be coordinatized inhomogeneously over a finite field $K$, such that$P_3=(\infty),\; P_2=(0),\; P_1=(1,1)$ and $(0,0)$ is the common point of the tangents at $P_2$ and $P_3$. The oval $\mathfrak o$ can be described using a bijective function $f: K^*:=K\cup \setminus \{0\} \mapsto K^*$:

$$\mathfrak o=\{(x,y)\in K^2\; | \; y=f(x), \; x\ne 0\}\; \cup \; \{(0),(\infty)\}\; .$$

For a point $P=(x,y), \; x\in K\setminus\{0,1\}$, the expression $m(x)=\tfrac{f(x)-1}{x-1}$ is the slope of the secant $\overline{PP_1}\; .$ Because both the functions $x\mapsto f(x)-1$ and $x\mapsto x-1$ are bijections from $K\setminus\{0,1\}$ to $K\setminus\{0,-1\}$, and $x\mapsto m(x)$ a bijection from $K\setminus\{0,1\}$ onto $K\setminus\{0,m_1\}$, where $m_1$ is the slope of the tangent at $P_1$, for $K^{**}:=K\setminus\{0,1\}\; :$ we get

$$\prod_{x\in K^{**}}(f(x)-1)=\prod_{x\in K^{**}}(x-1)=1 \quad \text{und}\quad
m_1\cdot\prod_{x\in K^{**}}\frac{f(x)-1}{x-1}=-1\; .$$

(Remark: For $K^*:= K\setminus\{0\}$ we have: $\displaystyle \prod_{k\in K^*}k=-1\; .$)
Hence

$$-1=m_1\cdot\prod_{x\in K^{**}}\frac{f(x)-1}{x-1}=
m_1\cdot\frac{
\displaystyle \prod_{x\in K^{**}}(f(x)-1)}{
\displaystyle \prod_{x\in K^{**}}(x-1)}=m_1\; .$$

Because the slopes of line $\overline{P_5P_6}$ and tangent $\overline{P_1P_1}$ both are $-1$, it follows that $\overline{P_1P_1}\cap \overline{P_2P_3}=P_4 \in\overline{P_5P_6}$. This is true for any triangle $P_1,P_2,P_3 \in \mathfrak o$.

So: (P3) of the 3-point Pascal theorem holds and the oval is a non degenerate conic.

== Sources ==
- B. Segre: Ovals in a finite projective plane, Canadian Journal of Mathematics 7 (1955), pp. 414–416.
- G. Järnefelt & P. Kustaanheimo: An observation on finite Geometries, Den 11 te Skandinaviske Matematikerkongress, Trondheim (1949), pp. 166–182.
- Albrecht Beutelspacher, Ute Rosenbaum: Projektive Geometrie. 2. Auflage. Vieweg, Wiesbaden 2004, ISBN 3-528-17241-X, p. 162.
- P. Dembowski: Finite Geometries. Springer-Verlag, 1968, ISBN 3-540-61786-8, p. 149
