= 1559 Kustaanheimo =

Stony asteroid from the inner regions of the asteroid belt

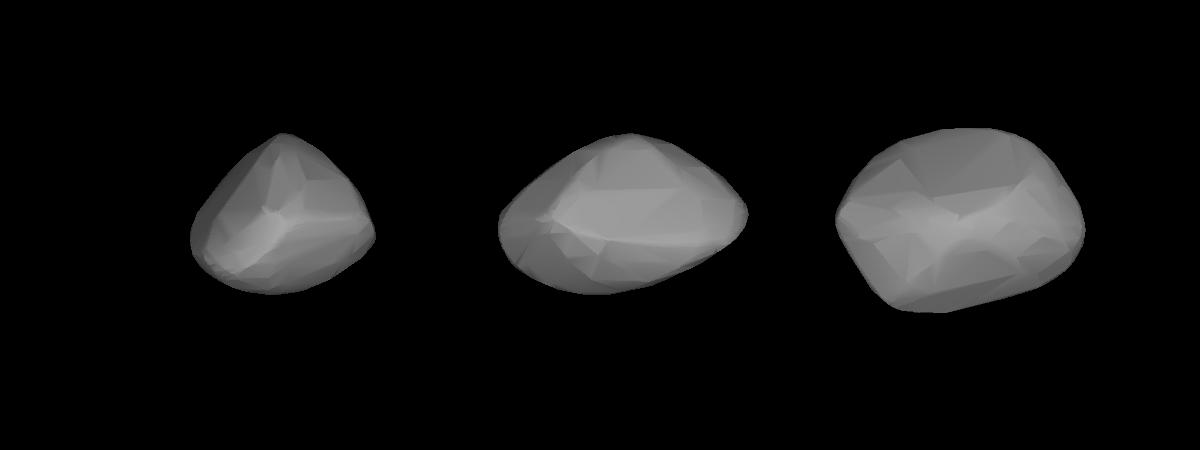
- Lightcurve-based 3D-model of Kustaanheimo

Discovery
- Discovered by: L. Oterma
- Discovery site: Turku Obs.
- Discovery date: 20 January 1942

Designations
- Named after: Paul Kustaanheimo (Finnish astronomer)
- Alternative designations: 1942 BF · 1935 FP; 1935 HB
- Minor planet category: main-belt · (inner)

Orbital characteristics
- Epoch 4 September 2017 (JD 2458000.5)
- Uncertainty parameter 0
- Observation arc: 82.20 yr (30,023 days)
- Aphelion: 2.7103 AU
- Perihelion: 2.0702 AU
- Semi-major axis: 2.3903 AU
- Eccentricity: 0.1339
- Orbital period (sidereal): 3.70 yr (1,350 days)
- Mean anomaly: 119.55°
- Mean motion: 0° 16^{m} 0.12^{s} / day
- Inclination: 3.1911°
- Longitude of ascending node: 327.92°
- Argument of perihelion: 216.59°

Physical characteristics
- Dimensions: 9.07±0.65 km 10.725±0.176 km 11.395±0.103 km 12.39 km (calculated); 12.70±0.85 km
- Synodic rotation period: 4.286±0.003 h 4.3±0.1 h (Note: Lightcurve plot of (1559) Kustaanheimo by Petr Prave at Ondrejov Observatory (2016). Rotation period of 4.3 hours with an amplitude of 0.29 magnitude. Quality Code of 2. Summary figures at Ondrejov Asteroid Photometry Project and the LCDB); 4.302±0.002 h 4.30435 h
- Geometric albedo: 0.193±0.028; 0.20 (assumed); 0.2401±0.0455; 0.267±0.048; 0.373±0.077
- Spectral type: S
- Absolute magnitude (H): 11.90 · 12.0

1559 Kustaanheimo (provisional designation 1942 BF) is a stony asteroid from the inner regions of the asteroid belt, approximately 11 kilometers in diameter. It was discovered on 20 January 1942, by Finnish astronomer Liisi Oterma at the Iso-Heikkilä Observatory near Turku in southwest Finland. The asteroid was named after Finnish astronomer Paul Kustaanheimo (1924–1997).

== Orbit and classification ==
Kustaanheimo is an asteroid from the main belt's background population that does not belong to any known asteroid family. It orbits the Sun in the inner main-belt at a distance of 2.1–2.7 AU once every 3 years and 8 months (1,350 days). Its orbit has an eccentricity of 0.13 and an inclination of 3° with respect to the ecliptic.

In March 1935, the asteroid was first identified as 1935 FP at the Union Observatory in Johannesburg. The body's observation arc begins at Johannesburg in the following month, with its identification as 1935 HB, almost 7 years prior to its official discovery observation at Turku.

== Physical characteristics ==
Kustaanheimo is an assumed stony S-type asteroid.

=== Rotation period ===
In February 2005, a rotational lightcurve of Kustaanheimo was obtained from photometric observations by American astronomer John Menke at his Menke Observatory in Barnesville, Maryland (no obs. code). Lightcurve analysis gave a rotation period of 4.286 hours with a brightness variation of 0.25 magnitude (U=3). One month later, another well-defined lightcurve by French amateur astronomer Laurent Bernasconi gave a period of 4.302 hours and an amplitude of 0.23 magnitude (U=3). In April 2016, Petr Pravec obtained an intermediary period of 4.3 hours with a brightness variation of 0.29 at the Ondřejov Observatory (U=2).

=== Spin axis ===
In 2013, an international study modeled a lightcurve with a similar period of 4.30435 hours and found two spin axis of (275.0°, 29.0°) and (94.0°, 33.0°) in ecliptic coordinates (λ, β) .

=== Diameter and albedo ===
According to the surveys carried out by the Japanese Akari satellite and the NEOWISE mission of NASA's Wide-field Infrared Survey Explorer, Kustaanheimo measures between 9.07 and 12.70 kilometers in diameter and its surface has an albedo between 0.193 and 0.373.

The Collaborative Asteroid Lightcurve Link assumes a standard albedo for stony asteroids of 0.20 and calculates a diameter of 12.39 kilometers based on an absolute magnitude of 11.9.

== Naming ==
This minor planet was named after Paul Kustaanheimo (1924–1997), a Finnish astronomer at the Helsinki University Observatory who made important contributions to celestial mechanics and the theory of relativity and best known for his K-S transformation. In 1969, he was appointed professor of astronomy at the University of Helsinki after the retirement of Gustaf Järnefelt (also see 1558 Järnefelt).

The official naming citation was published by the Minor Planet Center on 20 February 1976 (M.P.C. 3930).
