= Moser regularization =

Method to avoid singularities in classical mechanics

In mathematical physics, the Moser regularization is a method to transform the flow of the Kepler problem, meaning the motion of celestial bodies, into a geodesic flow on the sphere using the Moser (regularization) map. Both are named after Jürgen Moser, who introduced them in 1970.

== Moser map ==
Similar to the stereographic projection, the Moser map $\Phi\colon T^*\mathbb{R}^n\rightarrow T^*(S^n\setminus\{0\})$ is given by:

$$\Phi_1(\mathbf{q},\mathbf{p})
:=\left(\frac{2\mathbf{p}}{p^2+1},\frac{2p^2}{p^2+1}-1\right);$$
$$\Phi_2(\mathbf{q},\mathbf{p})
:=\left(-\frac{1}{2}(p^2+1)\mathbf{q}+(\mathbf{q}\cdot\mathbf{p})\mathbf{p},-\mathbf{q}\cdot\mathbf{p}\right).$$

== Properties ==
- The Moser map $\Phi$ is a symplectomorphism.

== See also ==
- Levi-Civita regularization, based on the real Hopf fibration
- Kustaanheimo–Stiefel regularization, based on the complex Hopf fibration
- Ligon–Schaaf regularization

== Literature ==
- Moser, Jürgen (1970). "Regularization of Kepler's Problem and the Averaging Method on a Manifold". Comm. Pure Appl. Math. 23 (4): 609–636. doi:10.1002/cpa.3160230406.
- Heckman, Gert; de Laat, Tim (2012). "On the Regularization of the Kepler Problem". J. Symplectic Geom. 10 (3): 463–473. arXiv:1007.3695. doi:10.4310/JSG.2012.v10.n3.a5.
- Frauenfelder, Urs; van Koert, Otto (2018). "Chapter 4.1 Moser regularization". The Restricted Three-Body Problem and Holomorphic Curves. doi:10.1007/978-3-319-72278-8. eISSN 2367-346X. ISBN 978-3-319-72278-8. ISSN 2367-3451.
