= Kustaanheimo–Stiefel regularization =

Method to avoid singularities in classical mechanics

In mathematical physics, the Kustaanheimo–Stiefel regularization is a method to transform the spatial Kepler problem into a spatial harmonic oscillator using the Kustaanheimo–Stiefel (regularization) map. Both are named after Paul Kustaanheimo and Eduard Stiefel, who introduced them in 1965. Simply put, the idea is to increase the dimension to untangle singularities arising from collisions.

== Kustaanheimo–Stiefel map ==
The Kustaanheimo–Stiefel map is an extension of the complex Hopf fibration $h_\mathbb{C}\colon S^3\rightarrow S^2$, using complex and complex projective space given by $h_\mathbb{C}\colon\mathbb{C}^2\supset S^3\rightarrow S^2\cong\mathbb{C}P^1, (z,w)\mapsto[z:w]$, by a squared radial component. It is a map $\Phi\colon\mathbb{R}^4\rightarrow\mathbb{R}^3$ given by filling with $0\mapsto 0$ of the map:

$$h_\mathbb{C}\times-^2\colon
\mathbb{R}^4
\cong S^3\times\mathbb{R}^+\rightarrow S^2\times\mathbb{R}^+
\cong\mathbb{R}^3.$$

In cartesian coordinates, the Kustaanheimo–Stiefel map $\mathbb{R}^4\rightarrow\mathbb{R}^3, (x,y,z,w)\mapsto(a,b,c)$ is given by:

$$a=x^2-y^2-z^2+w^2;$$
$$b=2(xy-zw);$$
$$c=2(xz+yw).$$

The above squaring of the distance, hence a$a^2+b^2+c^2=(x^2+y^2+z^2+w^2)^2$, follows from the binomial formulas.

== See also ==
- Levi-Civita regularization, analogous using the real Hopf fibration
- Moser regularization
- Ligon–Schaaf regularization

== Literature ==
- Kustaanheimo, Paul (1964). "Spinor regularisation of the Kepler motion". Annales Universitatis Turkuensis A. 73: 1–7.
- Kustaanheimo, Paul; Stiefel, Eduard (1965). "Perturbation theory of Kepler motion based on spinor regularization". Journal für die reine und angewandte Mathematik. 1965 (218): 204–219. doi:10.1515/crll.1965.218.204.
- Waldvogel, Jörg (2007). "Fundamentals of Regularizationin Celestial Mechanics and Linear Perturbation Theories" (PDF). people.math.ethz.ch.
