= Fermi–Walker transport =

Mathematical technique in general relativity

Fermi–Walker transport is a process in general relativity used to define a coordinate system or reference frame such that all curvature in the frame is due to the presence of mass/energy density and not due to arbitrary spin or rotation of the frame. It was discovered by Enrico Fermi in 1921 and rediscovered by Arthur Geoffrey Walker in 1932.

== Fermi–Walker differentiation ==
In the theory of Lorentzian manifolds, Fermi–Walker differentiation is a generalization of covariant differentiation. In general relativity, Fermi–Walker derivatives of the spacelike vector fields in a frame field, taken with respect to the timelike unit vector field in the frame field, are used to define non-inertial and non-rotating frames, by stipulating that the Fermi–Walker derivatives should vanish. In the special case of inertial frames, the Fermi–Walker derivatives reduce to covariant derivatives.

With a $(-+++)$ sign convention, this is defined for a vector field X along a curve $\gamma(s)$:

$$\frac{D_F X}{d s}=\frac{DX}{d s} - \left(X,\frac{DV}{d s}\right) V + (X,V)\frac{DV}{d s},$$

where V is four-velocity, D is the covariant derivative, and $( \cdot , \cdot )$ is the scalar product. If

$$\frac{D_F X}{d s}=0,$$

then the vector field X is Fermi–Walker transported along the curve. Vectors perpendicular to the space of four-velocities in Minkowski spacetime, e.g., polarization vectors, under Fermi–Walker transport experience Thomas precession.

Using the Fermi derivative, the Bargmann–Michel–Telegdi equation for spin precession of electron in an external electromagnetic field can be written as follows:

$$\frac{D_Fa^{\tau}}{ds} =  2\mu (F^{\tau \lambda} - u^{\tau} u_{\sigma} F^{\sigma \lambda})a_{\lambda},$$

where $a^{\tau}$ and $\mu$ are polarization four-vector and magnetic moment, $u^{\tau}$ is four-velocity of electron, $a^{\tau}a_{\tau} = -u^{\tau}u_{\tau} = -1$, $u^{\tau} a_{\tau}=0$, and $F^{\tau \sigma}$ is the electromagnetic field strength tensor. The right side describes Larmor precession.

== Co-moving coordinate systems ==
A coordinate system co-moving with a particle can be defined. If we take the unit vector $v^{\mu}$ as defining an axis in the co-moving coordinate system, then any system transforming with proper time is said to be undergoing Fermi–Walker transport.

== Generalised Fermi–Walker differentiation ==
Fermi–Walker differentiation can be extended for any $V$ where $(V,V)\ne0$ (that is, not a light-like vector). This is defined for a vector field $X$ along a curve $\gamma(s)$:

$\frac{\mathcal D X}{d s}=\frac{D X}{d s} + \left(X,\frac{DV}{d s}\right)\frac{V}{(V,V)} - \frac{(X,V)}{(V,V)}\frac{DV}{d s} - \left(V,\frac{DV}{d s}\right)\frac{(X,V)}{(V,V)^2} V ,$

Except for the last term, which is new, and basically caused by the possibility that $(V, V)$ is not constant, it can be derived by taking the previous equation, and dividing each $V^2$ by $(V,V)$.

If $(V,V)=-1$, then we recover the Fermi–Walker differentiation:

$\left(V,\frac{DV}{d s}\right)=\frac{1}{2}\frac{d}{ds}(V,V)=0\ ,$ and $\frac{\mathcal{D} X}{d s}=\frac{D_F X}{d s} .$

== See also ==
- Basic introduction to the mathematics of curved spacetime
- Enrico Fermi
- Arthur Geoffrey Walker
- Transition from Newtonian mechanics to general relativity
