= Theoretical motivation for general relativity =

A theoretical motivation for general relativity, including the motivation for the geodesic equation and the Einstein field equation, can be obtained from special relativity by examining the dynamics of particles in circular orbits about the Earth. A key advantage in examining circular orbits is that it is possible to know the solution of the Einstein Field Equation a priori. This provides a means to inform and verify the formalism.

General relativity addresses two questions:

1. How does the curvature of spacetime affect the motion of matter?
2. How does the presence of matter affect the curvature of spacetime?

The former question is answered with the geodesic equation. The second question is answered with the Einstein field equation. The geodesic equation and the field equation are related through a principle of least action. The motivation for the geodesic equation is provided in the section Geodesic equation for circular orbits. The motivation for the Einstein field equation is provided in the section Stress–energy tensor.

== Geodesic equation for circular orbits ==
=== Kinetics of circular orbits ===
World line of a circular orbit about the Earth depicted in two spatial dimensions X and Y (the plane of the orbit) and a time dimension, usually put as the vertical axis. Note that the orbit about the Earth is a circle in space, but its worldline is a helix in spacetime.

For definiteness consider a circular Earth orbit (helical world line) of a particle. The particle travels with speed v. An observer on Earth sees that length is contracted in the frame of the particle. A measuring stick traveling with the particle appears shorter to the Earth observer. Therefore, the circumference of the orbit, which is in the direction of motion appears longer than $\pi$ times the diameter of the orbit.

In special relativity the 4-proper-velocity of the particle in the inertial (non-accelerating) frame of the earth is

$$u = \left ( \gamma , \gamma { \mathbf{v} \over c } \right )$$

where c is the speed of light, $\mathbf{v}$ is the 3-velocity, and $\gamma$ is

$$\gamma =  { 1 \over \sqrt { { 1 - { { \mathbf{v} \cdot \mathbf{v} } \over c^2 } } } }$$.

The magnitude of the 4-velocity vector is always constant

$$u_{\alpha} u^{\alpha} = -1$$

where we are using a Minkowski metric

$$\eta^{\mu\nu} =\eta_{\mu\nu} = \begin{pmatrix}
-1 & 0 & 0 & 0\\
0 & 1 & 0 & 0\\
0 & 0 & 1 & 0\\
0 & 0 & 0 & 1
\end{pmatrix}$$.

The magnitude of the 4-velocity is therefore a Lorentz scalar.

The 4-acceleration in the Earth (non-accelerating) frame is

$$a \equiv { {d u} \over {d\tau}    } = { d \over {d\tau}  } { \left ( \gamma , \gamma { \mathbf{v} \over c } \right )} = { \left ( 0 , \gamma^2 { \mathbf{a} \over c^2 } \right )} = { \left ( 0 , - \gamma^2 { { \mathbf{v} \cdot \mathbf{v} } \over c^2 } { {\mathbf{r} }  \over r^2 } \right )}$$

where $d\tau$ is c times the proper time interval measured in the frame of the particle. This is related to the time interval in the Earth's frame by

$$c dt = \gamma d\tau$$.

Here, the 3-acceleration for a circular orbit is

$$\mathbf{a} = - \omega^2 \mathbf{r} = - { \mathbf{v} \cdot \mathbf{v} } { {\mathbf{r} }  \over r^2 }$$

where $\omega$ is the angular velocity of the rotating particle and $\mathbf{r}$ is the 3-position of the particle.

The magnitude of the 4-velocity is constant. This implies that the 4-acceleration must be perpendicular to the 4-velocity. The inner product of the 4-acceleration and the 4-velocity is therefore always zero. The inner product is a Lorentz scalar.

=== Curvature of spacetime: Geodesic equation ===
The equation for the acceleration can be generalized, yielding the geodesic equation

$${ {d u^{\mu}} \over {d\tau}} - a^{\mu} = 0$$

$${ {d u^{\mu}} \over {d\tau}} + {R^{\mu}}_{\alpha \nu \beta } u^{\alpha} x^{\nu}  u^{\beta} = 0$$

where $x^{\mu}$ is the 4-position of the particle and ${R^{\mu}}_{\alpha \nu \beta }$ is the curvature tensor given by

$${R^{\mu}}_{\alpha \nu \beta } = {  1   \over r^2     } \eta_{\alpha \beta}  {\delta^{\mu}}_{\nu}$$

where ${\delta^{\mu}}_{\nu}$ is the Kronecker delta function, and we have the constraints

$$u_{\alpha} u^{\alpha} = -1$$

and

$$a_{\alpha} u^{\alpha} = 0$$.

It is easily verified that circular orbits satisfy the geodesic equation. The geodesic equation is actually more general. Circular orbits are a particular solution of the equation. Solutions other than circular orbits are permissible and valid.

=== Ricci curvature tensor and trace ===
The Ricci curvature tensor is a special curvature tensor given by the contraction

$$R_{\alpha  \beta } \equiv {R^{\nu}}_{\alpha \nu \beta }$$.

The trace of the Ricci tensor, called the scalar curvature, is

$$R \equiv {R^{\alpha}}_{  \alpha }$$.

=== The geodesic equation in a local coordinate system ===
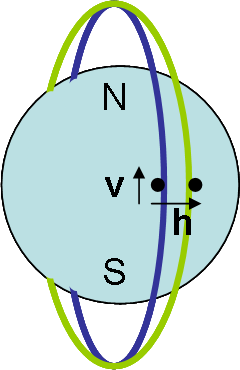
Circular orbits at the same radius

Consider the situation in which there are now two particles in nearby circular polar orbits of the Earth at radius $r$ and speed $v$.

The particles execute simple harmonic motion about the Earth and with respect to each other. They are at their maximum distance from each other as they cross the equator. Their trajectories intersect at the poles.

Imagine a spacecraft co-moving with one of the particles. The ceiling of the craft, the $\acute{\mathbf{z}}$ direction, coincides with the $\mathbf{r}$ direction. The front of the craft is in the $\acute{\mathbf{x} }$ direction, and the $\acute{\mathbf{y} }$ direction is to the left of the craft. The spacecraft is small compared with the size of the orbit so that the local frame is a local Lorentz frame. The 4-separation of the two particles is given by $\acute{x}^{\mu}$. In the local frame of the spacecraft the geodesic equation is given by

$${ {d^2 \acute{x}^{\mu}} \over {d\tau^2}} +  \acute{{R}^{\mu} }_{\alpha \nu \beta } \acute{u}^{\alpha} \acute{x}^{\nu}  \acute{u}^{\beta} = 0$$

where

$$\acute{u}^{\mu} = { {d \acute{x}^{\mu}} \over {d\tau}}$$

and

$$\acute{{R}^{\mu}}_{\alpha \nu \beta }$$

is the curvature tensor in the local frame.

=== Geodesic equation as a covariant derivative ===
The equation of motion for a particle in flat spacetime and in the absence of forces is

$${ {d {u}^{\mu}} \over {d\tau}} =0$$.

If we require a particle to travel along a geodesic in curved spacetime, then the analogous expression in curved spacetime is

$${ {D \acute{u}^{\mu}} \over {D\tau}}= { {d \acute{u}^{\mu}} \over {d\tau}} + {\Gamma ^{\mu}}_{\alpha \beta} \acute{u}^{\alpha} \acute{u}^{\beta}  =0$$

where the derivative on the left is the covariant derivative, which is the generalization of the normal derivative to a derivative in curved spacetime. Here

$${\Gamma ^{\mu}}_{\alpha \beta}$$

is a Christoffel symbol.

The curvature is related to the Christoffel symbol by

$$\acute{{R}^{\mu}}_{\alpha \nu \beta } = { { \partial {{\Gamma}^{\mu}}}_{\alpha \beta}  \over {\partial x^{\nu}}  }
- { { \partial {{\Gamma}^{\mu}}}_{\alpha \nu}  \over {\partial x^{\beta}}  }
+ {{\Gamma}^{\mu}}_{\gamma \nu} {{\Gamma}^{\gamma}}_{\alpha \beta}
- {{\Gamma}^{\mu}}_{\gamma \beta} {{\Gamma}^{\gamma}}_{\alpha \nu}$$.

=== Metric tensor in the local frame ===
The interval in the local frame is

$$ds^2  = dx^2 +dy^2 + dz^2 - c^2 dt^2 \equiv g_{\mu \nu } d \acute{x}^{\mu} d \acute{x}^{\nu}$$

$$= d \acute{x} ^2 +d\acute{y}^2 + d\acute{z}^2 - c^2 d\acute{t}^2  +2\gamma \cos(\theta ) \cos(\phi) \,v \, d\acute{t} \,d\acute{x} +2\gamma \cos(\theta ) \sin (\phi) v \,d\acute{t} \,d\acute{y} -2\gamma \sin(\theta )  v \, d\acute{t} \, d\acute{z}$$

where

$\theta$ is the angle with the $z$ axis (longitude) and

$\phi$ is the angle with the $x$ axis (latitude).

This gives a metric of

$$g_{\mu\nu} = \begin{pmatrix}
-1 & \gamma \cos( \theta ) \cos ( \phi ) \frac{v}{c} & \gamma \cos( \theta ) \sin ( \phi ) \frac{v}{c} & -\gamma \sin ( \theta ) \frac{v}{c} \\
\gamma \cos( \theta ) \cos ( \phi ) {\frac{v}{c}} & 1 & 0 & 0\\
\gamma \cos( \theta ) \sin ( \phi ) {\frac{v}{c}} & 0 & 1 & 0\\
-\gamma \sin ( \theta ) \frac{v}{c} & 0 & 0 & 1
\end{pmatrix}$$

in the local frame.

The inverse of the metric tensor $g^{\mu \nu}$ is defined such that

$$g_{\mu \alpha} g^{\alpha \nu} = \delta_{\mu}^{\nu}$$

where the term on the right is the Kronecker delta.

The transformation of the infinitesimal 4-volume $d\Omega$ is

$$d\acute{\Omega} = \sqrt{-g} d{\Omega }$$

where g is the determinant of the metric tensor.

The differential of the determinant of the metric tensor is

$$dg = g g^{\mu \nu} dg_{\mu \nu} = -g g_{\mu \nu} dg^{\mu \nu}$$.

The relationship between the Christoffel symbols and the metric tensor is

$${{\Gamma}^{\alpha}}_{ \mu \nu } = g^{\alpha \beta} {\Gamma}_{\beta \mu \nu }$$

$${\Gamma}_{\beta \mu \nu } = {\frac{1}{2}} \left (
{ { \partial {g}}_{\beta \nu}  \over {\partial x^{\mu}}  }
+ { { \partial {g}}_{\beta \mu}  \over {\partial x^{\nu}}  }
- { { \partial {g}}_{\mu \nu}  \over {\partial x^{\beta}}  }
\right )$$.

=== Principle of least action in general relativity ===
The principle of least action states that the world line between two events in spacetime is that world line that minimizes the action between the two events. In classical mechanics the principle of least action is used to derive Newton's laws of motion and is the basis for Lagrangian dynamics. In relativity it is expressed as

$$S = \int_1^2 \mathcal{L}\, d\Omega$$

between events 1 and 2 is a minimum. Here S is a scalar and

$$\mathcal{L}$$

is known as the Lagrangian density. The Lagrangian density is divided into two parts, the density for the orbiting particle $\mathcal{L}_p$ and the density $\mathcal{L}_e$ of the gravitational field generated by all other particles including those comprising the Earth,

$$\mathcal{L} = \mathcal{L}_p + \mathcal{L}_e$$.

In curved spacetime, the "shortest" world line is that geodesic that minimizes the curvature along the geodesic. The action then is proportional to the curvature of the world line. Since S is a scalar, the scalar curvature is the appropriate measure of curvature. The action for the particle is therefore

$$S_p = C \int_1^2 \acute{R}\, d\acute{\Omega}  = C \int_1^2 { \acute{R} } \sqrt{-g} \,d{\Omega} = C \int_1^2 g^{\alpha \beta} \acute{R}_{\alpha \beta} \sqrt{-g}\, d{\Omega}$$

where $C$ is an unknown constant. This constant will be determined by requiring the theory to reduce to Newton's law of gravitation in the nonrelativistic limit.

The Lagrangian density for the particle is therefore

$$\mathcal{L}_p = C g^{\alpha \beta} \acute{R}_{\alpha \beta} \sqrt{-g}$$.

The action for the particle and the Earth is

$$S = \int_1^2 C g^{\alpha \beta} \acute{R}_{\alpha \beta} \sqrt{-g}\, d\Omega  + \int_1^2 \mathcal{L}_e \,d\Omega$$.

Thus the world line that lies on the surface of the sphere of radius r by varying the metric tensor. Minimization and neglect of terms that disappear on the boundaries, including terms second order in the derivative of g, yields

$$0 = \delta S = \int_1^2 C \left (  \acute{R}_{\alpha \beta} - {1\over 2} \acute{R} g^{\alpha \beta} \right )  \delta g^{\alpha \beta} \sqrt{-g}\, d\Omega  - \int_1^2  \acute{T}_{\alpha \beta}  \delta g^{\alpha \beta} \sqrt{-g}\, d\Omega$$

where

$$\acute{T}_{\alpha \beta} =  { 1 \over \sqrt{-g}  } \left ( {d \over {dx^{\nu} } }   { { \partial \mathcal{L}_e} \over { \partial \left ( { {d g^{ \alpha \beta } } \over { dx^{\nu}  }  }   \right ) }    }  - {  {\partial \mathcal{L}_e} \over { \partial g^{ \alpha \beta }  }    }  \right )$$

is the Hilbert stress–energy tensor of the field generated by the Earth.

The relationship, to within an unknown constant factor, between the stress-energy and the curvature is

$$\acute{T}_{\alpha \beta} =   C \left (  \acute{R}_{\alpha \beta} - {1\over 2} \acute{R} \, g_{\alpha \beta} \right )$$.

== Stress–energy tensor ==
=== Newton's law of gravitation ===
Diagram 1. Changing views of spacetime along the world line of a rapidly accelerating observer. In this animation, the dashed line is the spacetime trajectory ("world line") of a particle. The balls are placed at regular intervals of proper time along the world line. The solid diagonal lines are the light cones for the observer's current event, and intersect at that event. The small dots are other arbitrary events in the spacetime. For the observer's current instantaneous inertial frame of reference, the vertical direction indicates the time and the horizontal direction indicates distance. The slope of the world line (deviation from being vertical) is the velocity of the particle on that section of the world line. So at a bend in the world line the particle is being accelerated. Note how the view of spacetime changes when the observer accelerates, changing the instantaneous inertial frame of reference. These changes are governed by the Lorentz transformations. Also note that: * the balls on the world line before/after future/past accelerations are more spaced out due to time dilation. * events which were simultaneous before an acceleration are at different times afterwards (due to the relativity of simultaneity), * events pass through the light cone lines due to the progression of proper time, but not due to the change of views caused by the accelerations, and * the world line always remains within the future and past light cones of the current event.

Newton's Law of Gravitation in non-relativistic mechanics states that the acceleration on an object of mass $m$ due to another object of mass $M$ is equal to

$$\mathbf{f}  =  {d^2 \mathbf{r} \over d\tau^2} =    - {GM \over  { c^2 r^3} }\mathbf{r}$$

where $G$ is the gravitational constant, $\mathbf{r}$ is a vector from mass $M$ to mass $m$ and $r$ is the magnitude of that vector. The time t is scaled with the speed of light c

$$\tau  \equiv c t$$.

The acceleration $\mathbf{f}$ is independent of $m$.

For definiteness. consider a particle of mass $m$ orbiting in the gravitational field of the Earth with mass $M$. The law of gravitation can be written

$$\mathbf{f}  =      - {4\pi G \over  {3 c^2} }\rho(r) \mathbf{r}$$

where $\rho(r)$ is the average mass density inside a sphere of radius $r$.

=== Gravitational force in terms of the 00 component of the stress–energy tensor ===
Newton's law can be written

$$\mathbf{f}  =      - {4\pi G \over  {3 c^4}} \left ( {Mc^2 \over  V }\right ) \mathbf{r}$$.

where $V$ is the volume of a sphere of radius $r$. The quantity $Mc^2$ will be recognized from special relativity as the rest energy of the large body, the Earth. This is the sum of the rest energies of all the particles that compose Earth. The quantity in the parentheses is then the average rest energy density of a sphere of radius $r$ about the Earth. The gravitational field is proportional to the average energy density within a radius r. This is the 00 component of the stress–energy tensor in relativity for the special case in which all the energy is rest energy. More generally

$$T_{00} = - {T^{0}}_0  =  \sum_{i=1}^N \left ( {\gamma_i m_i c^2 \over  V }\right )$$

where

$$\gamma_i \equiv  { 1 \over {\sqrt {1 - {{\mathbf{v}_i \cdot \mathbf{v}_i } \over c^2} } } }$$

and $\mathbf{v_i}$ is the velocity of particle i making up the Earth and $m_i$ in the rest mass of particle i. There are N particles altogether making up the Earth.

=== Relativistic generalization of the energy density ===
The components of the stress–energy tensor

There are two simple relativistic entities that reduce to the 00 component of the stress–energy tensor in the nonrelativistic limit

$$u^{\alpha} T_{\alpha \beta} u^{\beta} \rightarrow T_{00}$$

and the trace

$$T \equiv {T^{\alpha}}_{\alpha}  =  -u_{\alpha} u^{\alpha} T =  -u^{\alpha} T \eta_{\alpha \beta} u^{\beta} \rightarrow - T_{00}$$

where $u^{\alpha}$ is the 4-velocity.

The 00 component of the stress–energy tensor can be generalized to the relativistic case as a linear combination of the two terms

$$T_{00}  \rightarrow  u^{\alpha} \left ( A T_{\alpha \beta}  + B T \eta_{\alpha \beta} \right ) u^{\beta}$$

where

$$A + B = 1$$

=== 4-acceleration due to gravity ===
The 4-acceleration due to gravity can be written

$$f^{\mu} = - 8\pi  { G \over { 3 c^4   }   } \left (  {A \over 2} T_{\alpha \beta} + {B \over 2} T \eta_{\alpha \beta} \right )\delta^{\mu}_{\nu}    u^{\alpha} x^{\nu} u^{\beta}$$.

Unfortunately, this acceleration is nonzero for $\mu = 0$ as is required for circular orbits. Since the magnitude of the 4-velocity is constant, it is only the component of the force perpendicular to the 4-velocity that contributes to the acceleration. We must therefore subtract off the component of force parallel to the 4-velocity. This is known as Fermi–Walker transport. In other words,

$$f^{\mu} \rightarrow f^{\mu} + u^{\mu} u_{\nu} f^{\nu}$$.

This yields

$$f^{\mu} = - 8\pi  { G \over { 3 c^4   }   } \left (  {A \over 2} T_{\alpha \beta}  + {B \over 2} T \eta_{\alpha \beta} \right ) \left ( \delta^{\mu}_{\nu} + u^{\mu} u_{\nu} \right )  u^{\alpha} x^{\nu} u^{\beta}$$.

The force in the local frame is

$$\acute{f}^{\mu} = - 8\pi  { G \over { 3 c^4   }   } \left (  {A \over 2}  \acute{T}_{\alpha \beta}  + {B \over 2}  \acute{T} g_{\alpha \beta} \right ) \left ( \delta^{\mu}_{\nu} +  \acute{u}^{\mu}  \acute{u}_{\nu} \right )   \acute{u}^{\alpha} \acute{x}^{\nu}  \acute{u}^{\beta}$$.

== Einstein field equation ==
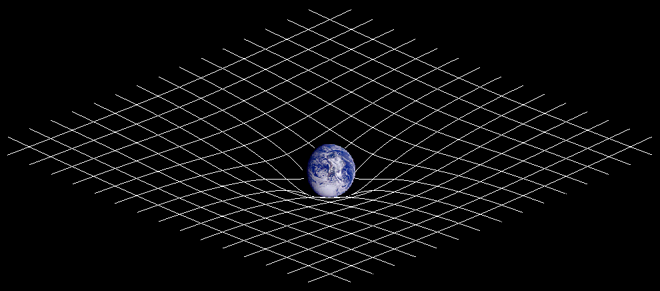
Two-dimensional visualization of space-time distortion. The presence of matter changes the geometry of spacetime, this (curved) geometry being interpreted as gravity.

The Einstein field equation is obtained by equating the acceleration required for circular orbits with the acceleration due to gravity

$$a^{\mu} = f^{\mu}$$

$$\acute{{R}^{\mu}}_{\alpha \nu \beta}  \acute{u}^{\alpha} \acute{x}^{\nu}  \acute{u}^{\beta} =  - \acute{f}^{\mu}$$.

This is the relationship between curvature of spacetime and the stress–energy tensor.

The Ricci tensor becomes

$$\acute{R}_{\alpha  \beta} =  8\pi { G \over {  c^4   }   } \left (   { A \over 2   } \acute{T}_{\alpha \beta}  + {B \over 2}  \acute{T} g_{\alpha \beta} \right )$$.

The trace of the Ricci tensor is

$$\acute{R} = \acute{R}_{\alpha}^{  \alpha} =  8\pi { G \over {  c^4   }   } \left (  {A\over 2}\acute{T}_{\alpha}^{ \alpha}  + {B \over 2} \acute{T} \delta_{\alpha}^{ \alpha} \right ) = 8\pi { G \over {  c^4   }   }  \left ( {A\over 2} + 2B \right ) \acute{T }$$.

Comparison of the Ricci tensor with the Ricci tensor calculated from the principle of least action, Theoretical motivation for general relativity#Principle of least action in general relativity identifying the stress–energy tensor with the Hilbert stress-energy, and remembering that A+B=1 removes the ambiguity in A, B, and C.

$$A=2$$

$$B=-1$$

and

$$C=  \left ( 8\pi { G \over {  c^4 }  } \right )^{-1}$$.

This gives

$$\acute{R} =  - 8\pi { G \over {  c^4   }   }   \acute{T }$$.

The field equation can be written

$$\mathcal{G}_{\alpha  \beta} =  8\pi { G \over {  c^4   }   }   \acute{T}_{\alpha \beta}$$

where

$$\mathcal{G}_{\alpha  \beta} \equiv       \acute{R}_{\alpha \beta} - {1 \over 2} \acute{R} g_{\alpha \beta}$$.

This is the Einstein field equation that describes curvature of spacetime that results from stress-energy density. This equation, along with the geodesic equation have been motivated by the kinetics and dynamics of a particle orbiting the Earth in a circular orbit. They are true in general.

== Solving the Einstein field equation ==
Solving the Einstein field equation requires an iterative process. The solution is represented in the metric tensor

$$g_{\mu \nu}$$.

Typically there is an initial guess for the tensor. The guess is used to calculate Christoffel symbols, which are used to calculate the curvature. If the Einstein field equation is not satisfied, the process is repeated.

Solutions occur in two forms, vacuum solutions and non-vacuum solutions. A vacuum solution is one in which the stress–energy tensor is zero. The relevant vacuum solution for circular orbits is the Schwarzschild metric. There are also a number of exact solutions that are non-vacuum solutions, solutions in which the stress tensor is non-zero.

== Solving the geodesic equation ==
Solving the geodesic equations requires knowledge of the metric tensor obtained through the solution of the Einstein field equation. Either the Christoffel symbols or the curvature are calculated from the metric tensor. The geodesic equation is then integrated with the appropriate boundary conditions.

== Electrodynamics in curved spacetime ==
Maxwell's equations, the equations of electrodynamics, in curved spacetime are a generalization of Maxwell's equations in flat spacetime (see Formulation of Maxwell's equations in special relativity). Curvature of spacetime affects electrodynamics. Maxwell's equations in curved spacetime can be obtained by replacing the derivatives in the equations in flat spacetime with covariant derivatives. The sourced and source-free equations become (cgs units):

$${ 4 \pi \over c   }J^ b = \partial_a F^{ab} + {\Gamma^a}_{\mu a} F^{\mu b} + {\Gamma^b}_{\mu a} F^{a \mu} \equiv D_a F^{ab} \equiv {F^{ab}}_{;a} \,\!$$,

and

$$0 = \partial_c F_{ab} + \partial_b F_{ca} + \partial_a F_{bc} = D_c F_{ab} + D_b F_{ca} + D_a F_{bc}$$

where $\, J^a$ is the 4-current, $\, F^{ab}$ is the field strength tensor, $\, \epsilon_{abcd}$ is the Levi-Civita symbol, and

$${ \partial \over { \partial x^a }   } \equiv \partial_a \equiv {}_{,a} \equiv (\partial/\partial ct, \nabla)$$

is the 4-gradient. Repeated indices are summed over according to Einstein summation convention. We have displayed the results in several common notations.

The first tensor equation is an expression of the two inhomogeneous Maxwell's equations, Gauss' law and the Ampère's law with Maxwell's correction. The second equation is an expression of the homogeneous equations, Faraday's law of induction and Gauss's law for magnetism.

The electromagnetic wave equation is modified from the equation in flat spacetime in two ways, the derivative is replaced with the covariant derivative and a new term that depends on the curvature appears.

$$- {A^{\alpha ; \beta}}_{; \beta} + {R^{\alpha}}_{\beta} A^{\beta} = {4 \pi \over c } J^{\alpha}$$

where the 4-potential is defined such that

$$F^{ab} = \partial^b A^a - \partial^a A^b \,\!$$.

We have assumed the generalization of the Lorenz gauge in curved spacetime

$${A^{\mu}}_{ ; \mu}  = 0$$.

== See also ==
- Newtonian motivations for general relativity
