= Ligon–Schaaf regularization =

Method to avoid singularities in classical mechanics

In mathematical physics, the Ligon–Schaaf regularization is a method to describe the singularities of collisions in the Kepler problem using the Ligon–Schaaf (regularization) map. Both are named after Thomas Ligon and Manfred Schaaf, who introduced them in 1976. (Thomas Ligon wrote his Diploma Thesis, now Master Thesis, about them under Manfred Schaaf's supervision.) Compared to other methods of regularization, the Ligon–Schaaf regularization possesses special properties like not transforming time or being able to transform all negative energy levels together. (The related Moser regularization requires a fixed energy.)

== Ligon–Schaaf map ==
Let $E\colon T^*(\mathbb{R}^2\setminus\{0\})\rightarrow\mathbb{R}, (q,p)\mapsto\frac{1}{2}|p|^2-\frac{1}{|q|}$ the Hamilton function (energy) of the Kepler problem. Let furthermore:

$$u(q,p)
:=\left(\sqrt{-2E(q,p)}|q|p,|p|^2|q|-1\right)
\in\mathbb{R}^3;$$
$$v(q,p)
:=\left(|q|^{-1}q-\langle q,p\rangle,\sqrt{-2E(q,p)}\langle q,p\rangle\right)
\in\mathbb{R}^3;$$
$$\phi(q,p)
:=\sqrt{-2E(q,p)}\langle q,p\rangle.$$

The Ligon–Schaaf map $\Phi\colon T^*(\mathbb{R}^2\setminus\{0\})\supset E^{-1}((-\infty,0])\rightarrow T^*S^2\setminus S^2$ is then given by:

$$\Phi(q,p)
:=\left(\cos(\phi)u+\sin(\phi)v,\sin(\phi)u-\cos(\phi)v\right)
\in T^*S^2\subset T^*\mathbb{R}^3\cong \mathbb{R}^3\times\mathbb{R}^3.$$

== Properties ==
- $u$ and $v$ are orthonormal, hence $\langle u,v\rangle=0$, $|u|=1$ und $|v|=1$. Hence the Ligon–Schaaf map indeed maps to the subset $T^*S^2\subset T^*\mathbb{R}^3\cong \mathbb{R}^3\times\mathbb{R}^3$ and is therefore well-defined.
- The Ligon–Schaaf map $\Phi$ is a symplectomorphism.
- With the Delaunay Hamiltonian $D\colon T^*S^2\setminus S^2\rightarrow\mathbb{R}, y\mapsto -\frac{1}{2y^2}$, one has:
  $$E=D\circ\Phi.$$
- With the cross product $\mu\colon T^*S^2\setminus S^2\rightarrow\mathbb{R}^3, (x,y)\mapsto x\times y$, the Runge–Lenz vector $A$ and angular momentum $L$:
  $$\left(\frac{(A_2,-A_1))}{\sqrt{-2E}},L\right)=\mu\circ\Phi.$$

== See also ==
- Levi-Civita regularization, based on the real Hopf fibration
- Kustaanheimo–Stiefel regularization, based on the complex Hopf fibration
- Moser regularization

== Literature ==
- Ligon, Thomas; Schaaf, Manfred (1976). "On the global symmetry of the classical Kepler problem". Reports on Mathematical Physics. 9 (3): 281–300. doi:10.1016/0034-4877(76)90061-6. ISSN 0034-4877.
- Cushman, R. H.; Duistermaat, J. J. (1998-12-08). "A characterization of the Ligon-Schaaf regularization map". Comm. Pure Appl. Math. 50 (8): 773–787. doi:10.1002/(SICI)1097-0312(199708)50:8.
- Heckman, Gert; de Laat, Tim (2010). "On the Regularization of the Kepler Problem". J. Symplectic Geom. 12 (3): 463–473. arXiv:1007.3695. doi:10.4310/JSG.2012.v10.n3.a5.
- Ligon, Thomas (2018). "The symmetry of the Kepler problem, the inverse Ligon-Schaaf mapping and the Birkhoff conjecture". PLoS ONE. 13 (9): 1–23. doi:10.1371/journal.pone.0203821.
- Frauenfelder, Urs; van Koert, Otto (2018). "Chapter 4.3 Ligon–Schaaf regularization". The Restricted Three-Body Problem and Holomorphic Curves. doi:10.1007/978-3-319-72278-8. eISSN 2367-346X. ISBN 978-3-319-72278-8. ISSN 2367-3451.
