= Solving the geodesic equations =

Procedure in mathematics

Solving the geodesic equations is a procedure used in mathematics, particularly Riemannian geometry, and in physics, particularly in general relativity, that results in obtaining geodesics. Physically, these represent the paths of (usually ideal) particles with no proper acceleration, their motion satisfying the geodesic equations. Because the particles are subject to no proper acceleration, the geodesics generally represent the straightest path between two points in a curved spacetime.

== The differential geodesic equation ==
On an n-dimensional Riemannian manifold $M$, the geodesic equation written in a coordinate chart with coordinates $x^a$ is:

$$\frac{d^2x^a}{ds^2} + {\Gamma^a}_{bc}\frac{dx^b}{ds}\frac{dx^c}{ds} = 0$$

where the coordinates x^{a}(s) are regarded as the coordinates of a curve γ(s) in $M$ and $\Gamma^{a}_{bc}$ are the Christoffel symbols of the second kind. The Christoffel symbols are functions of the metric and are given by:

$${\Gamma^a}_{bc} = \frac{1}{2} g^{ad} \left( g_{cd,b} + g_{bd,c} - g_{bc,d} \right)$$

where the comma indicates a partial derivative with respect to the coordinates:

$$g_{ab,c} = \frac{\partial {g_{ab}}}{\partial {x^c}}$$

As the manifold has dimension $n$, the geodesic equations are a system of $n$ ordinary differential equations for the $n$ coordinate variables. Thus, allied with initial conditions, the system can, according to the Picard–Lindelöf theorem, be solved. One can also use a Lagrangian approach to the problem: defining

$$L = \sqrt{ g_{\mu \nu} \frac{d x^{\mu}}{d s} \frac{d x^{\nu}}{d s} }$$

and applying the Euler–Lagrange equation.

== Heuristics ==
As the laws of physics can be written in any coordinate system, it is convenient to choose one that simplifies the geodesic equations. Mathematically, this means a coordinate chart is chosen in which the geodesic equations have a particularly tractable form. For example, consider a rotationally symmetric manifold: a natural choice would be a coordinate system which matches the manifolds' symmetry, and as a result the geodesic equation(s) will simplify greatly. This is a direct consequence of Noether's theorem, e.g. any surface of revolution corresponds to conservation of angular momentum.

== Effective potentials ==
When the geodesic equations can be separated into terms containing only an undifferentiated variable and terms containing only its derivative, the former may be consolidated into an effective potential dependent only on position. In this case, many of the heuristic methods of analysing energy diagrams apply, in particular the location of turning points.

== Solution techniques ==
Solving the geodesic equations means obtaining an exact solution, possibly even the general solution, of the geodesic equations. Most attacks secretly employ the point symmetry group of the system of geodesic equations. This often yields a result giving a family of solutions implicitly, but in many examples does yield the general solution in explicit form.

In general relativity, to obtain timelike geodesics it is often simplest to start from the spacetime metric, after dividing by $ds^2$ to obtain the form

$$-1 = g_{\mu\nu}\dot{x}^\mu\dot{x}^\nu$$

where the dot represents differentiation with respect to $s$. Because timelike geodesics are maximal, one may apply the Euler–Lagrange equation directly, and thus obtain a set of equations equivalent to the geodesic equations. This method has the advantage of bypassing a tedious calculation of Christoffel symbols.

== See also ==
- Geodesics of the Schwarzschild vacuum
- Mathematics of general relativity
- Transition from special relativity to general relativity
