= Schild's ladder =

First-order method for approximating parallel transport of a vector along a curve

Two rungs of Schild's ladder. The segments A_{1}X_{1} and A_{2}X_{2} are an approximation to first order of the parallel transport of A_{0}X_{0} along the curve.

In the theory of general relativity, and differential geometry more generally, Schild's ladder is a first-order method for approximating parallel transport of a vector along a curve using only affinely parametrized geodesics. The method is named for Alfred Schild, who introduced the method during lectures at Princeton University.

== Construction ==
The idea is to identify a tangent vector x at a point $A_0$ with a geodesic segment of unit length $A_0X_0$, and to construct an approximate parallelogram with approximately parallel sides $A_0X_0$ and $A_1X_1$ as an approximation of the Levi-Civita parallelogramoid; the new segment $A_1X_1$ thus corresponds to an approximately parallel translated tangent vector at $A_1.$

A curve in M with a "vector" X_{0} at A_{0}, identified here as a geodesic segment.

Select A_{1} on the original curve. The point P_{1} is the midpoint of the geodesic segment X_{0}A_{1}.

The point X_{1} is obtained by following the geodesic A_{0}P_{1} for twice its parameter length.

Formally, consider a curve γ through a point A_{0} in a Riemannian manifold M, and let x be a tangent vector at A_{0}. Then x can be identified with a geodesic segment A_{0}X_{0} via the exponential map. This geodesic σ satisfies

$$\sigma(0)=A_0\,$$
$$\sigma'(0) = x.\,$$

The steps of the Schild's ladder construction are:

- Let X_{0} = σ(1), so the geodesic segment $A_0X_0$ has unit length.
- Now let A_{1} be a point on γ close to A_{0}, and construct the geodesic X_{0}A_{1}.
- Let P_{1} be the midpoint of X_{0}A_{1} in the sense that the segments X_{0}P_{1} and P_{1}A_{1} take an equal affine parameter to traverse.
- Construct the geodesic A_{0}P_{1}, and extend it to a point X_{1} so that the parameter length of A_{0}X_{1} is double that of A_{0}P_{1}.
- Finally construct the geodesic A_{1}X_{1}. The tangent to this geodesic x_{1} is then the parallel transport of X_{0} to A_{1}, at least to first order.

== Approximation ==
This is a discrete approximation of the continuous process of parallel transport. If the ambient space is flat, this is exactly parallel transport, and the steps define parallelograms, which agree with the Levi-Civita parallelogramoid.

In a curved space, the error is given by holonomy around the triangle $A_1A_0X_0,$ which is equal to the integral of the curvature over the interior of the triangle, by the Ambrose-Singer theorem; this is a form of Green's theorem (integral around a curve related to integral over interior), and in the case of Levi-Civita connections on surfaces, of Gauss–Bonnet theorem.

== Notes ==
1. Schild's ladder requires not only geodesics but also relative distance along geodesics. Relative distance may be provided by affine parametrization of geodesics, from which the required midpoints may be determined.
2. The parallel transport which is constructed by Schild's ladder is necessarily torsion-free.
3. A Riemannian metric is not required to generate the geodesics. But if the geodesics are generated from a Riemannian metric, the parallel transport which is constructed in the limit by Schild's ladder is the same as the Levi-Civita connection because this connection is defined to be torsion-free.
