= Ernesto Padova =

Italian mathematician (1845–1896)

- Born: 17 February 1845; Livorno
- Died: 9 March 1896 (aged 51); Padua
- Education: University of Pisa
- Scientific career
- Fields: Mathematics
- Workplaces: University of Pisa; University of Padua
- Doctoral advisor: Eugenio Beltrami

Ernesto Padova (17 February 1845 – 9 March 1896) was an Italian mathematician born in Livorno, Italy.

== Biography ==
He graduated at the University of Pisa in 1866 but he was also a student of the Scuola Normale of Pisa. He first taught in a high school in Naples and in 1872, having been put forward by Enrico Betti, he was appointed professor of rational mechanics at the University of Pisa. From there he moved on to Padua, where he remained until his premature death.

He has been author of about fifty works in the fields of mathematical analysis, analytical mechanics and mathematical-physics (elasticity and electromagnetism). Regards to analytical mechanics Padova has been one of the first to study matters concerning movement stability. In this field, among his students was Tullio Levi-Civita.

In 1891 he also became a member of the Accademia dei Lincei.
