= Levi-Civita regularization =

Method to avoid singularities in classical mechanics

In mathematical physics, the Levi-Civita regularization is a method to transform the perturbed planar Kepler problem into a perturbed harmonic oscillator using the Levi-Civita (regularization) map. Both are named after Tullio Levi-Civita, wo introduced them in 1920.

== Levi-Civita map ==
The Levi-Civita map is an extension of the real Hopf fibration $h_\mathbb{R}\colon S^1\rightarrow S^1$, using real and real projective space given by $h_\mathbb{R}\colon\mathbb{R}^2\supset S^1\rightarrow S^1\cong\mathbb{R}P^1, (x,y)\mapsto[x:y]$ or the complex plane by $h_\mathbb{R}\colon\mathbb{C}\supset S^1\rightarrow S^1\subset\mathbb{C}, z\mapsto z^2$, by a squared radial component. It is a map $\Phi\colon\mathbb{C}\rightarrow\mathbb{C}, z\mapsto z^2$ or alternatively a map $\Phi\colon\mathbb{R}^2\rightarrow\mathbb{R}^2$ given by filling with $0\mapsto 0$ of the map:

$$h_\mathbb{R}\times-^2\colon
\mathbb{R}^2\setminus\{0\}
\cong S^1\times\mathbb{R}^+\rightarrow S^1\times\mathbb{R}^+
\cong\mathbb{R}^2\setminus\{0\}.$$

In cartesian coordinates, the Levi-Civita map $\mathbb{R}^2\rightarrow\mathbb{R}^2, (x,y)\mapsto(a,b)$ is given by:

$$a=x^2-y^2;$$
$$b=2xy.$$

The above squaring of the distance, hence $a^2+b^2=(x^2+y^2)^2$, follows from the binomial formulas. The induced map on the cotangent bundle, better expressed in complex coordinates to shorten with complex conjugation, is given by:

$$\mathrm{d}^*\Phi\colon T^*(\mathbb{C}\setminus\{0\})\rightarrow T^*(\mathbb{C}\setminus\{0\}),(z,w)\mapsto \left(z^2,\frac{w}{2\overline{z}}\right).$$

== Levi-Civita regularization ==
Let $E\colon T^*(\mathbb{R}^2\setminus\{0\})\rightarrow\mathbb{R}, (q,p)\mapsto\frac{1}{2}|p|^2-\frac{1}{|q|}$ the Hamilton function (energy) of the Kepler problem, then the Levi-Civita regularization sends it onto a common denominator:

$$(E\circ\mathrm{d}^*\Phi)(p,q)
=\frac{|p|^2-8}{8|q|^2}.$$

== See also ==
- Kustaanheimo–Stiefel regularization, analogous using the complex Hopf fibration
- Moser regularization
- Ligon–Schaaf regularization

== Literature ==
- Levi-Civita, Tullio (1920). "Sur la régularisation du problème des trois corps". Acta Mathematica. 20: 99–144.
- Waldvogel, Jörg (2007). "Fundamentals of Regularizationin Celestial Mechanics and Linear Perturbation Theories" (PDF). people.math.ethz.ch.
- Frauenfelder, Urs; van Koert, Otto (2018). "Chapter 4.2 The Levi-Civita regularization". The Restricted Three-Body Problem and Holomorphic Curves. doi:10.1007/978-3-319-72278-8. eISSN 2367-346X. ISBN 978-3-319-72278-8. ISSN 2367-3451.
