= Libera Trevisani Levi-Civita =

Italian mathematician

- Born: 17 May 1890; Verona, Italy
- Died: 11 December 1973 (aged 83); Rome, Italy
- Education: University of Padua
- Scientific career
- Fields: Mathematics
- Thesis: Sul moto medio dei nodi nel problema dei tre corpi (1912)
- Doctoral advisor: Tullio Levi-Civita

Libera Trevisani Levi-Civita (17 May 1890 – 11 December 1973) was an Italian mathematician born in Verona.

== Biography ==
Libera Trevisani earned her classical lyceum A levels in 1908 at the "Bernardino Telesio" Lyceum in Cosenza. In the 1908–1909 academic year, she matriculated at the University of Padova.

In 1912, she graduated at the University of Padova, under the guidance of the mathematician Tullio Levi-Civita, with a thesis titled Sul moto medio dei nodi nel problema dei tre corpi ("About the average motion within the three body problem"). This thesis extended Levi-Civita's researches on the average asymptotic motion existence, for a point represented by the generic solution of a linear system with periodic coefficients, to the problem of the three bodies, whenever this is referred to the moon theory. The results achieved by Trevisani were so satisfactory that her mentor decided to present them to 28 April 1912 meeting at the Istituto veneto di scienze, lettere ed arti (Veneto's Institute of sciences, letters and arts). The note was published in the Atti (Records) in the same year.

In April 1914, the young Libera Trevisani married her mentor, Tullio Levi-Civita.

In 1944 she was elected president of the reinstated FILDIS (Federazione Italiana Laureate e Diplomate di Istituti Superiori – Federation of Italian Graduated Women in Higher Education) which had been dissolved in 1935 by the fascist regime. She remained in office until 1953 and carried on institutional initiatives aimed at the empowerment of women and the protection of women's rights.

In 1945 Libera retrieved Susanna Silberstein from the Florentine convent where her parents had placed her just before they were rounded up by the Nazis in 1943, and she later adopted her.
