= Newtonian motivations for general relativity =

Some of the basic concepts of general relativity can be outlined outside the relativistic domain. In particular, the idea that mass–energy generates curvature in space and that curvature affects the motion of masses can be illustrated in a Newtonian setting. We use circular orbits as our prototype. This has the advantage that we know the kinetics of circular orbits. This allows us to calculate curvature of orbits in space directly and compare the results with dynamical forces.

== The equivalence of gravitational and inertial mass ==
A unique feature of the gravitational force is that all massive objects accelerate in the same manner in a gravitational field. This is often expressed as "The gravitational mass is equal to the inertial mass." This allows us to think of gravity as a curvature of spacetime.

== Test for flatness in spacetime ==
If initially parallel paths of two particles on nearby geodesics remain parallel within some accuracy, then spacetime is flat to within that accuracy. [Ref. 2, p. 30]

== Two nearby particles in a radial gravitational field ==
=== Newtonian mechanics for circular orbits ===
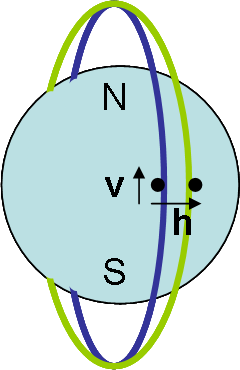
Circular orbits at the same radius.

==== The geodesic and field equations for circular orbits ====
Consider the situation in which there are two particles in nearby circular polar orbits of the Earth at radius $r$ and speed $v$. Since the orbits are circular, the gravitational force on the particles must equal the centripetal force,

$${v^2 \over r} = {GM \over r^2}$$

where G is the gravitational constant and $M$ is the mass of the earth.

The particles execute simple harmonic motion about the earth and with respect to each other. They are at their maximum distance from each other as they cross the equator. Their trajectories intersect at the poles.

From Newton's Law of Gravitation the separation vector $\mathbf{h}$ can be shown to be given by the "geodesic equation"

$${d^2 \mathbf{h} \over d\tau^2} + R \mathbf{h} = 0$$

where $R = {1 \over r^2 } {v^2 \over c^2 }$ is the curvature of the trajectory and $\tau = ct$ is the speed of light c times the time.

The curvature of the trajectory is generated by the mass of the earth $M$. This is represented by the "field equation"

$$R = {GM \over { r^3} }$$

In this example, the field equation is simply a statement of the Newtonian concept that centripetal force is equal to gravitational force for circular orbits. We refer to this expression as a field equation in order to highlight the similarities with the Einstein field equation. This equation is in a much different form than Gauss's law, which is the usual characterization of the field equation in Newtonian mechanics.

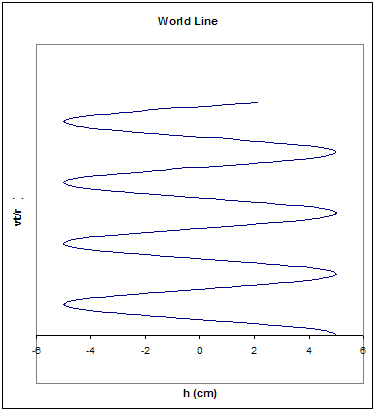
The position of the moving particle with respect to the particle at rest in the co-moving reference frame.

==== Relationship between curvature and mass density ====
Mass can be written in terms of the average mass density $\rho (r)$ inside a sphere of radius $r$ by the expression

$$M = {4\pi\rho (r) r^3 \over 3 }$$.

The field equation becomes

$$R = {4 \pi G \over {3 } } \rho (r)$$.

The curvature of the particle trajectories is proportional to mass density.

==== Local measurements ====
A requirement of General Relativity is that all measurements must be made locally. Imagine that the particles are inside a windowless spacecraft co-orbiting the Earth with the center of mass of the spacecraft coincident with one of the particles. That particle would be at rest with respect to the spacecraft. An observer in the spacecraft would have no indication that the craft was orbiting Earth. The observer is only allowed to measure the behavior of the particles in the frame of the craft.

In this example, we can define a local coordinate system such that the $z$-direction is toward the ceiling of the craft and this is directed along $\mathbf{r}$. The $x$-direction is toward the front of the craft and is in the direction of $\mathbf{v}$. The $y$-direction is toward the left side of the craft.

In this frame, the vector $\mathbf{h}$ is the position vector for the second particle. An observer in the craft would think the second particle was oscillating in a potential well generated by a gravitational field. This is an example of a coordinate acceleration due to the choice of frames as opposed to a physical acceleration due to actual forces.

=== General motion in the earth's gravitational field ===
==== Elliptic and hyperbolic trajectories ====
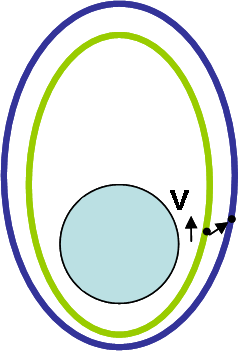
Co-planar elliptic orbits. The particle in the outer orbit travels slower than the particle in the inner orbit. They will separate with time.

More generally, particles move in elliptic or hyperbolic trajectories in a plane that contains the earth center. The orbits need not be circular. One can obtain intuitive geodesic and field equations in those situations as well [Ref 2, Chapter 1]. Unlike circular orbits, however, the speed of the particles in elliptic or hyperbolic trajectories is not constant. We therefore do not have a constant speed with which to scale the curvature. Therefore, in anticipation of the transition to relativistic mechanics, the trajectories and curvatures are scaled with the speed of light $c$.

From Newton's Law of Gravitation

$${d^2 \mathbf{r} \over dt^2} = - {GM \over r^3}\mathbf{r}$$

one can obtain the geodesic equation for the separation of two particles in nearby trajectories

$${d^2 \mathbf{h} \over d\tau^2} + R \mathbf{h} = 0$$

and the field equation

$$R = R_{\perp} = {GM \over {c^2 r^3}} = {4 \pi G \over {3 c^2 } }\rho (r)$$

if the particle separation is perpendicular to $\mathbf{r}$ and

$$R = R_{\|} = -{2GM \over {c^2 r^3}} = -{8 \pi G \over {3 c^2 } }\rho (r)$$

if the separation is parallel to $\mathbf{r}$. In the calculation of $R_{\|}$ the radius was expanded in terms of $\mathbf{h}$. Only the linear term was retained.

In the case that the separation of the particle is radial, the curvature is negative. This will cause the particles to separate rather than to be drawn toward each other as in the case in which they have the same radius. This is easy to understand. Outer orbits travel slower than inner orbits. This leads to particle separation.

==== Local coordinate system ====
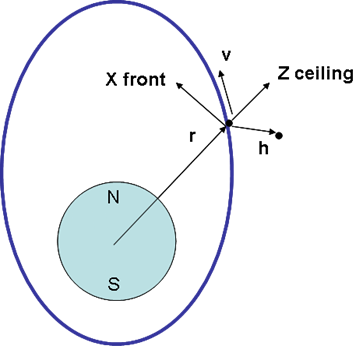
Local "diagonal" coordinate system for an elliptic orbit.

A local coordinate system for a space craft co-moving with one of the particles can again be defined. The $z$-direction, toward the ceiling, is in the direction of $\mathbf{r}$. The $x$-direction, toward the front of the craft, is perpendicular to $\mathbf{r}$ but still in the plane of the trajectory. Unlike in a circular orbit, this craft no longer necessarily points in the direction of the velocity. The $y$-direction is toward the left side of the craft.

== Tensor description ==
=== Simple diagonal frame ===
The geodesic equation in a radial gravitational field can be described succinctly in tensor notation [Ref. 2, p. 37] in the co-moving frame in which the ceiling of the space craft is in the $\mathbf{\hat r}$ direction

$${d^2 h^i \over ds^2} + R^i_j h^j = 0$$

where the Latin indices are over the spatial directions in the co-moving system, and we have used the Einstein summation convention in which repeated indices are summed. The curvature tensor $R^i_j$ is given by

$$\begin{Vmatrix} R^1_1 & R^2_1 & R^3_1\\ R^1_2 & R^2_2 & R^3_2\\ R^1_3 & R^2_3 & R^3_3 \end{Vmatrix} = \begin{Vmatrix} R_\perp & 0 & 0\\ 0 & R_\perp & 0\\ 0 & 0 & R_\| \end{Vmatrix}$$

and the separation vector is given by

$$\begin{Vmatrix} h^1 & h^2 & h^3\end{Vmatrix} = \begin{Vmatrix} \mathbf{h}\cdot\mathbf{\hat x} & \mathbf{h}\cdot\mathbf{\hat y} & \mathbf{h}\cdot\mathbf{\hat z}\end{Vmatrix}$$

where $\mathbf{h}\cdot\mathbf{\hat x}$ is the component of $\mathbf{h}$ in the $\mathbf{\hat x}$ direction, $\mathbf{h}\cdot\mathbf{\hat y}$ is the component in the $\mathbf{\hat y}$ direction, and $\mathbf{h}\cdot\mathbf{\hat z}$ is the component in the $\mathbf{\hat z}$ direction.

In this co-moving coordinate system the curvature tensor is diagonal. This is not true in general.

=== Arbitrary orientation of the local frame ===
The co-moving spacecraft has no windows. An observer is not able to tell which direction is the $\mathbf{\hat r}$ direction, nor can he/she know which direction is the velocity with respect to earth. The orientation of the spacecraft may be quite different from the simple coordinate system in which the ceiling is in the $\mathbf{\hat r}$ direction and the front of the craft is in a direction coplanar with the radius and the velocity. We can transform our simple coordinates to an arbitrarily oriented coordinate system through rotations. This, however, destroys the diagonal nature of the curvature matrix.

Rotations are performed with a rotation matrix $\mathcal{C}$ such that the separation vector $\mathbf{\bar h}$ is related to the separation vector before rotation $\mathbf{h}$ by the relation

$$\bar h^i = \mathcal{M}^i_jh^j$$.

The inverse $\bar{\mathcal{M}}$ of $\mathcal{M}$ is defined by

$$\bar{\mathcal{M}}^i_j \mathcal{M}^j_k = \delta^i_k$$,

which yields

$$h^i = \bar{\mathcal{M}}^i_j \bar h^j$$.

Here $\delta^i_k$ is the Kronecker delta.

A simple rotation matrix that rotates the coordinate axis through an angle $\theta$ about the $x$-axis is

$$\begin{Vmatrix}\mathcal{M}^1_1 & \mathcal{M}^2_1 & \mathcal{M}^3_1\\ \mathcal{M}^1_2 & \mathcal{M}^2_2 & \mathcal{M}^3_2\\ \mathcal{M}^1_3 & \mathcal{M}^2_3 & \mathcal{M}^3_3 \end{Vmatrix} = \begin{Vmatrix} 1 & 0 & 0\\ 0 & \cos(\theta ) & \sin(\theta )\\ 0 & -\sin(\theta ) & \cos(\theta )\end{Vmatrix}$$.

This is a rotation in the y-z plane. The inverse is obtained by switching the sign of $\theta$.

If the rotation matrix does not depend on time then the geodesic equation becomes, upon rotation

$${d^2 \bar h^i \over ds^2} + \bar R^i_j \bar h^j = 0$$

where

$$\bar R^i_j = \mathcal{M}^i_k R^k_l \bar{\mathcal{M}}^l_j$$.

The curvature in the new coordinate system is non-diagonal. The inverse problem of transforming an arbitrary coordinate system into a diagonal system can be performed mathematically with the process of diagonalization.

Diagram 1. Changing views of spacetime along the world line of a rapidly accelerating observer. In this animation, the dashed line is the spacetime trajectory ("world line") of a particle. The balls are placed at regular intervals of proper time along the world line. The solid diagonal lines are the light cones for the observer's current event, and intersect at that event. The small dots are other arbitrary events in the spacetime. For the observer's current instantaneous inertial frame of reference, the vertical direction indicates the time and the horizontal direction indicates distance. The slope of the world line (deviation from being vertical) is the velocity of the particle on that section of the world line. So at a bend in the world line the particle is being accelerated. Note how the view of spacetime changes when the observer accelerates, changing the instantaneous inertial frame of reference. These changes are governed by the Lorentz transformations. Also note that: • the balls on the world line before/after future/past accelerations are more spaced out due to time dilation. • events which were simultaneous before an acceleration are at different times afterwards (due to the relativity of simultaneity), • events pass through the light cone lines due to the progression of proper time, but not due to the change of views caused by the accelerations, and • the world line always remains within the future and past light cones of the current event.

=== Time dependent rotation of the local frame: Christoffel symbols ===
The space craft may tumble about its center of mass. In that case the rotation matrix is time dependent. If the rotation matrix is time dependent, then it does not commute with the time derivative.

In that case, the rotation of the separation velocity can be written

$$\mathcal{M}^k_i {d h^i \over ds} = \mathcal{M}^k_i {d \bar{\mathcal{M}}^i_j \bar h^j \over ds}$$

which becomes

$${d \bar h^k \over ds} + \Gamma^k_j \bar h^j \ \stackrel{\mathrm{def}}{=}\  {D \bar h^k \over Ds}$$

where

$$\Gamma^k_j \ \stackrel{\mathrm{def}}{=}\  \mathcal{M}^k_i {d \bar{\mathcal{M}}^i_j \over ds}$$

is known as a Christoffel symbol.

The geodesic equation becomes

$${D^2 \bar h^i \over Ds^2} + \bar R^i_j \bar h^j = 0$$,

which is the same as before with the exception that the derivatives have been generalized.

=== Arbitrariness in the curvature ===
The velocity in the frame of the spacecraft can be written

$$\bar u^i \ \stackrel{\mathrm{def}}{=}\  {D \bar h^i \over Ds}$$.

The geodesic equation becomes

$${d \bar u^i \over ds} + \Gamma^i_j \bar u^j + \bar R^i_j \bar h^j = 0$$.

$${d^2 \bar h^i \over ds^2} + 2 \Gamma^i_j {d \bar h^i \over ds} + {d \Gamma^i_j \over ds} \bar h^j + \Gamma^i_j \Gamma^j_k \bar h^k + \bar R^i_j \bar h^j = 0$$.

In an arbitrarily rotating spacecraft, the curvature of space is due to two terms, one due to the mass density and one due to the arbitrary rotation of the spacecraft. The arbitrary rotation is non-physical and must be eliminated in any real physical theory of gravitation. In General Relativity this is done with a process called Fermi–Walker transport. In a Euclidean sense, Fermi–Walker transport is simply a statement that the spacecraft is not allowed to tumble

$$\Gamma^i_j = 0$$

for all i and j. The only time-dependent rotations allowed are those generated by the mass density.

== General geodesic and field equations in a Newtonian setting ==
=== Geodesic equation ===
$${D^2 \bar h^i \over Ds^2} + \bar R^i_j \bar h^j = 0$$

where

$${D \over Ds} \ \stackrel{\mathrm{def}}{=}\  {d \over ds} + \Gamma$$

and $\Gamma$ is a Christoffel symbol.

=== Field equation ===
$$\bar R^i_j = \mathcal{M}^i_k R^k_l \bar{\mathcal{M}}^l_j$$

where $\mathcal{M}^i_j$ is a rotation matrix and the curvature tensor is

$$\begin{Vmatrix} R^1_1 & R^2_1 & R^3_1\\ R^1_2 & R^2_2 & R^3_2\\ R^1_3 & R^2_3 & R^3_3 \end{Vmatrix} = \begin{Vmatrix} R_\perp & 0 & 0\\ 0 & R_\perp & 0\\ 0 & 0 & R_\| \end{Vmatrix}$$.

The curvature is proportional to the mass density

$$R_{\perp} = {4 \pi G \over {3 c^2 } }\rho (r)$$

$$R_{\|} = -{8 \pi G \over {3 c^2 } }\rho (r)$$.

=== Overview of the Newtonian picture ===
The geodesic and field equations simply are a restatement of Newton's Law of Gravitation as seen from a local frame of reference co-moving with the mass within the local frame. This picture contains many of the elements of General Relativity, including the concept that particles travel along geodesics in a curved space (spacetime in the relativistic case) and that the curvature is due to the presence of mass density (mass/energy density in the relativistic case). This picture also contains some of the mathematical machinery of General Relativity such as tensors, Christoffel symbols, and Fermi–Walker transport.

== Relativistic generalization ==
World line of a circular orbit about the Earth depicted in two spatial dimensions X and Y (the plane of the orbit) and a time dimension, usually put as the vertical axis. Note that the orbit about the Earth is (almost) a circle in space, but its worldline is a helix in spacetime.

General relativity generalizes the geodesic equation and the field equation to the relativistic realm in which trajectories in space are replaced with world lines in spacetime. The equations are also generalized to more complicated curvatures.

== See also ==
=== Biographies ===
Albert Einstein
Élie Cartan
Bernhard Riemann
Enrico Fermi

=== Related mathematics ===
Mathematics of general relativity
Basic introduction to the mathematics of curved spacetime
Tidal tensor
Frame fields in general relativity
