= Levi-Civita parallelogramoid =

Levi-Civita's parallelogramoid

In the mathematical field of differential geometry, the Levi-Civita parallelogramoid is a quadrilateral in a curved space whose construction generalizes that of a parallelogram in the Euclidean plane. It is named for its discoverer, Tullio Levi-Civita. Like a parallelogram, two opposite sides AA′ and BB′ of a parallelogramoid are parallel (via parallel transport along side AB) and the same length as each other, but the fourth side A′B′ will not in general be parallel to or the same length as the side AB, although it will be straight (a geodesic).

== Construction ==
A parallelogram in Euclidean geometry can be constructed as follows:

- Start with a straight line segment AB and another straight line segment AA′.
- Slide the segment AA′ along AB to the endpoint B, keeping the angle with AB constant, and remaining in the same plane as the points A, A′, and B.
- Label the endpoint of the resulting segment B′ so that the segment is BB′.
- Draw a straight line A′B′.

In a curved space, such as a Riemannian manifold or more generally any manifold equipped with an affine connection, the notion of "straight line" generalizes to that of a geodesic. In a suitable neighborhood (such as a ball in a normal coordinate system), any two points can be joined by a geodesic. The idea of sliding the one straight line along the other gives way to the more general notion of parallel transport. Thus, assuming either that the manifold is complete, or that the construction is taking place in a suitable neighborhood, the steps to producing a Levi-Civita parallelogram are:

- Start with a geodesic AB and another geodesic AA′. These geodesics are assumed to be parameterized by their arclength in the case of a Riemannian manifold, or to carry a choice of affine parameter in the general case of an affine connection.
- "Slide" (parallel transport) the tangent vector of AA′ from A to B.
- The resulting tangent vector at B generates a geodesic via the exponential map. Label the endpoint of this geodesic by B′, and the geodesic itself BB′.
- Connect the points A′ and B′ by the geodesic A′B′.

== Quantifying the difference from a parallelogram ==
The length of this last geodesic constructed connecting the remaining points A′B′ may in general be different than the length of the base AB. This difference is measured by the Riemann curvature tensor. To state the relationship precisely, let AA′ be the exponential of a tangent vector X at A, and AB the exponential of a tangent vector Y at A. Then

$$|A'B'|^2 = |AB|^2 + \frac{8}{3}\langle R(X,Y)X,Y\rangle + \text{higher order terms}$$

where terms of higher order in the length of the sides of the parallelogram have been suppressed.

== Discrete approximation ==
Two rungs of Schild's ladder. The segments A_{1}X_{1} and A_{2}X_{2} are an approximation to first order of the parallel transport of A_{0}X_{0} along the curve.

Parallel transport can be discretely approximated by Schild's ladder, which approximates Levi-Civita parallelogramoids by approximate parallelograms.
