= Tullio Levi-Civita =

Italian mathematician (1873–1941)

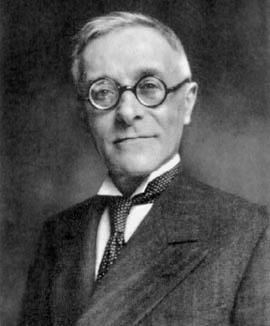
- Tullio Levi-Civita
- Born: 29 March 1873; Padova, Italy
- Died: 29 December 1941 (aged 68); Rome, Italy
- Education: University of Padova
- Known for: Tensor calculus; Levi-Civita symbol; Levi-Civita connection; Levi-Civita field; Levi-Civita parallelogramoid; Levi-Civita regularization
- Awards: Sylvester Medal (1922); FRS (1930)
- Scientific career
- Fields: Mathematics
- Workplaces: University of Rome
- Doctoral advisor: Gregorio Ricci-Curbastro
- Doctoral students: Evan Tom Davies; Albert Joseph McConnell; Octav Onicescu; Attilio Palatini; Antonio Signorini; Libera Trevisani; Giovanni Lampariello; Gheorghe Vrânceanu

Tullio Levi-Civita, ForMemRS (English: /ˈtʊlioʊ ˈlɛvi ˈtʃɪvɪtə/; Italian: [ˈtulljo ˈlɛːvi ˈtʃiːvita]; 29 March 1873 – 29 December 1941) was an Italian mathematician, most famous for his work on absolute differential calculus (tensor calculus) and its applications to the theory of relativity, but who also made significant contributions in other areas. He was a pupil of Gregorio Ricci-Curbastro, the inventor of tensor calculus. His work included foundational papers in both pure and applied mathematics, celestial mechanics (notably on the three-body problem), analytic mechanics (the Levi-Civita separability conditions in the Hamilton–Jacobi equation) and hydrodynamics.

== Biography ==
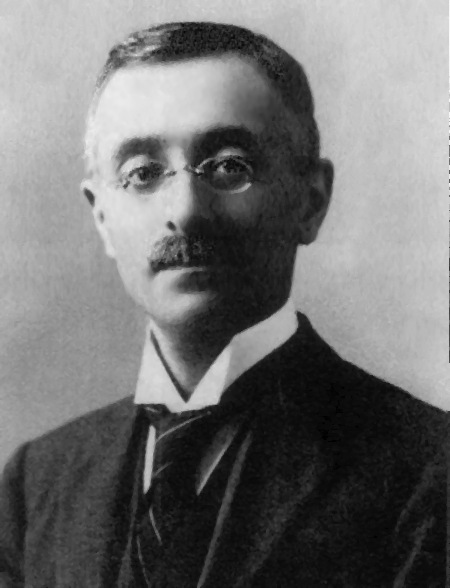
Tullio Levi-Civita

Born into an Italian Jewish family in Padova, Levi-Civita was the son of Giacomo Levi-Civita, a lawyer and former senator. He graduated in 1892 from the University of Padova Faculty of Mathematics. In 1894 he earned a teaching diploma after which he was appointed to the Faculty of Science teacher's college in Pavia. In 1898 he was appointed to the Padova Chair of Rational Mechanics (left uncovered by death of Ernesto Padova) where he met and, in 1914, married Libera Trevisani, one of his students. He remained in his position at Padova until 1918, when he was appointed to the Chair of Higher Analysis at the University of Rome; in another two years he was appointed to the Chair of Mechanics there.

In 1900 he and Ricci-Curbastro published the theory of tensors in Méthodes de calcul différentiel absolu et leurs applications, which Albert Einstein used as a resource to master tensor calculus, a critical tool in the development of the theory of general relativity. In 1917 he introduced the notion of parallel transport in Riemannian geometry, motivated by the will to simplify the computation of the curvature of a Riemannian manifold. Levi-Civita's series of papers on the problem of a static gravitational field were also discussed in his 1915–1917 correspondence with Einstein. The correspondence was initiated by Levi-Civita, as he found mathematical errors in Einstein's use of tensor calculus to explain the theory of relativity. Levi-Civita methodically kept all of Einstein's replies to him; and even though Einstein had not kept Levi-Civita's, the entire correspondence could be re-constructed from Levi-Civita's archive. It is evident from this that, after numerous letters, the two men had grown to respect each other. In one of the letters, regarding Levi-Civita's new work, Einstein wrote "I admire the elegance of your method of computation; it must be nice to ride through these fields upon the horse of true mathematics while the like of us have to make our way laboriously on foot". In 1933 Levi-Civita contributed to Paul Dirac's equations in quantum mechanics as well.

His textbook on tensor calculus, The Absolute Differential Calculus (originally a set of lecture notes in Italian co-authored with Ricci-Curbastro), remains one of the standard texts almost a century after its first publication, with several translations available.

In 1936, receiving an invitation from Einstein, Levi-Civita traveled to Princeton, United States and lived there with him for a year. But when the risk of war in Europe again rose, he returned to Italy. The 1938 race laws enacted by the Italian Fascist government deprived Levi-Civita of his professorship and of his membership of all scientific societies. Isolated from the scientific world, he died in his apartment in Rome on 29 December, 1941.

Among his PhD students were Octav Onicescu, Attilio Palatini, Giovanni Lampariello and Gheorghe Vrânceanu.

Later on, when asked what he liked best about Italy, Einstein said "spaghetti and Levi-Civita".

== Other studies and honors ==
Analytical dynamics was another aspect of Levi-Civita's studies: many of his articles examine the three-body problem. He wrote articles on hydrodynamics and on systems of differential equations. He is credited with improvements to the Cauchy–Kowalevski theorem, on which he wrote a book in 1931. In 1933, he contributed to work on the Dirac equation. He developed the Levi-Civita field, a system of numbers that includes infinitesimal quantities.

Levi-Civita was elected an international honorary member of the American Academy of Arts and Sciences in 1917. The Royal Society awarded him the Sylvester Medal in 1922 and elected him as a foreign member in 1930. He became an honorary member of the London Mathematical Society, of the Royal Society of Edinburgh, and of the Edinburgh Mathematical Society, following his participation in their colloquium in 1930 at the University of St Andrews. He was also a member of the Accademia dei Lincei, the Pontifical Academy of Sciences, and the American Philosophical Society.

== Works ==
All his mathematical works, except for the monographs, treatises and textbooks, were posthumously gathered in the six volumes of his "Collected works", in a revised typographical form amending both typographical errors and author's oversights.

=== Articles ===
- Ricci, Gregorio; Levi-Civita, Tullio (1900), "Méthodes de calcul différentiel absolu et leurs applications" [Methods of the absolute differential calculus and their applications] (PDF), Mathematische Annalen (in French), 54 (1–2): 125–201, doi:10.1007/BF01454201, JFM 31.0297.01, S2CID 120009332.
- Levi-Civita, Tullio (1904), "Sulla integrazione della equazione di Hamilton-Jacobi per separazione di variabili" [On the integration of the Hamilton-Jacobi equation by separation of variables], Mathematische Annalen (in Italian), 59 (3): 383–397, doi:10.1007/bf01445149, JFM 35.0362.02, S2CID 123144759.
- Levi-Civita, Tullio (1917), "Nozione di parallelismo in una varietà qualunque e conseguente specificazione geometrica della curvatura riemanniana" [Notion of parallelism in any variety and consequent geometric specification of the Riemannian curvature], Rendiconti del Circolo Matematico di Palermo (in Italian), 42: 173–205, doi:10.1007/BF03014898, JFM 46.1125.02, S2CID 122088291.

=== Books ===
- Tullio Levi-Civita and Ugo Amaldi Lezioni di meccanica razionale (Bologna: N. Zanichelli, 1923)
- Tullio Levi-Civita Questioni di meccanica classica e relativistica (Bologna, N. Zanichelli, 1924)
- Tullio Levi-Civita Lezioni di calcolo differenziale assoluto (Roma: Alberto Stock Editore 1925)
  - The Absolute Differential Calculus (London & Glasgow, Blackie & Son 1927) (edited by Enrico Persico, trans. by Marjorie Long)
- Tullio Levi-Civita and Enrico Persico Fondamenti di meccanica relativistica (Bologna : N. Zanichelli, 1928)
- Tullio Levi-Civita Caratteristiche dei sistemi differenziali e propagazione ondosa (Bologna, N. Zanichelli 1931)
- Tullio Levi-Civita and Ugo Amaldi Nozioni di balistica esterna (Bologna: N. Zanichelli, 1935)
- Tullio Levi Problème des N Corps en relativité générale (Gauthier-Villars, Paris, 1950, Mémorial des sciences mathématiques ISSN 0025-9187)
- Levi-Civita, Tullio (1954), Opere Matematiche. Memorie e Note [Collected mathematical works. Memoirs and notes] (PDF) (in French and Italian), vol. primo (1893−1900), Pubblicate a cura dell'Accademia Nazionale dei Lincei, Roma: Zanichelli Editore, pp. XXX, 564.
- Levi-Civita, Tullio (1956), Opere Matematiche. Memorie e Note [Collected mathematical works. Memoirs and notes] (PDF) (in French and Italian), vol. secondo (1901−1907), Pubblicate a cura dell'Accademia Nazionale dei Lincei, Roma: Zanichelli Editore, pp. VI, 636.
- Levi-Civita, Tullio (1957), Opere Matematiche. Memorie e Note [Collected mathematical works. Memoirs and notes] (PDF) (in French and Italian), vol. terzo (1908−1916), Pubblicate a cura dell'Accademia Nazionale dei Lincei, Roma: Zanichelli Editore, pp. VI, 600.
- Levi-Civita, Tullio (1960), Opere Matematiche. Memorie e Note [Collected mathematical works. Memoirs and notes] (PDF) (in French and Italian), vol. quarto (1917−1928), Pubblicate a cura dell'Accademia Nazionale dei Lincei, Roma: Zanichelli Editore, pp. VI, 608.
- Levi-Civita, Tullio (1970), Opere Matematiche. Memorie e Note [Collected mathematical works. Memoirs and notes] (in French and Italian), vol. quinto (1929−1937), Pubblicate a cura dell'Accademia Nazionale dei Lincei, Roma: Zanichelli Editore, pp. VI, 670.
- Levi-Civita, Tullio (1970), Opere Matematiche. Memorie e Note [Collected mathematical works. Memoirs and notes] (in French and Italian), vol. sesto (1938−1941), Pubblicate a cura dell'Accademia Nazionale dei Lincei, Roma: Zanichelli Editore, pp. VI, 502.
- Levi-Civita, Tullio (2007) [1895], Pamphlets, mathematics, University of Michigan. A collection of some of his published papers (in their original typographical form), probably an unordered uncorrected collection of offprints.

== See also ==
- Levi-Civita connection
- Levi-Civita crater
- Levi-Civita field
- Levi-Civita parallelogramoid
- Levi-Civita symbol
