= Helsinki University Observatory =

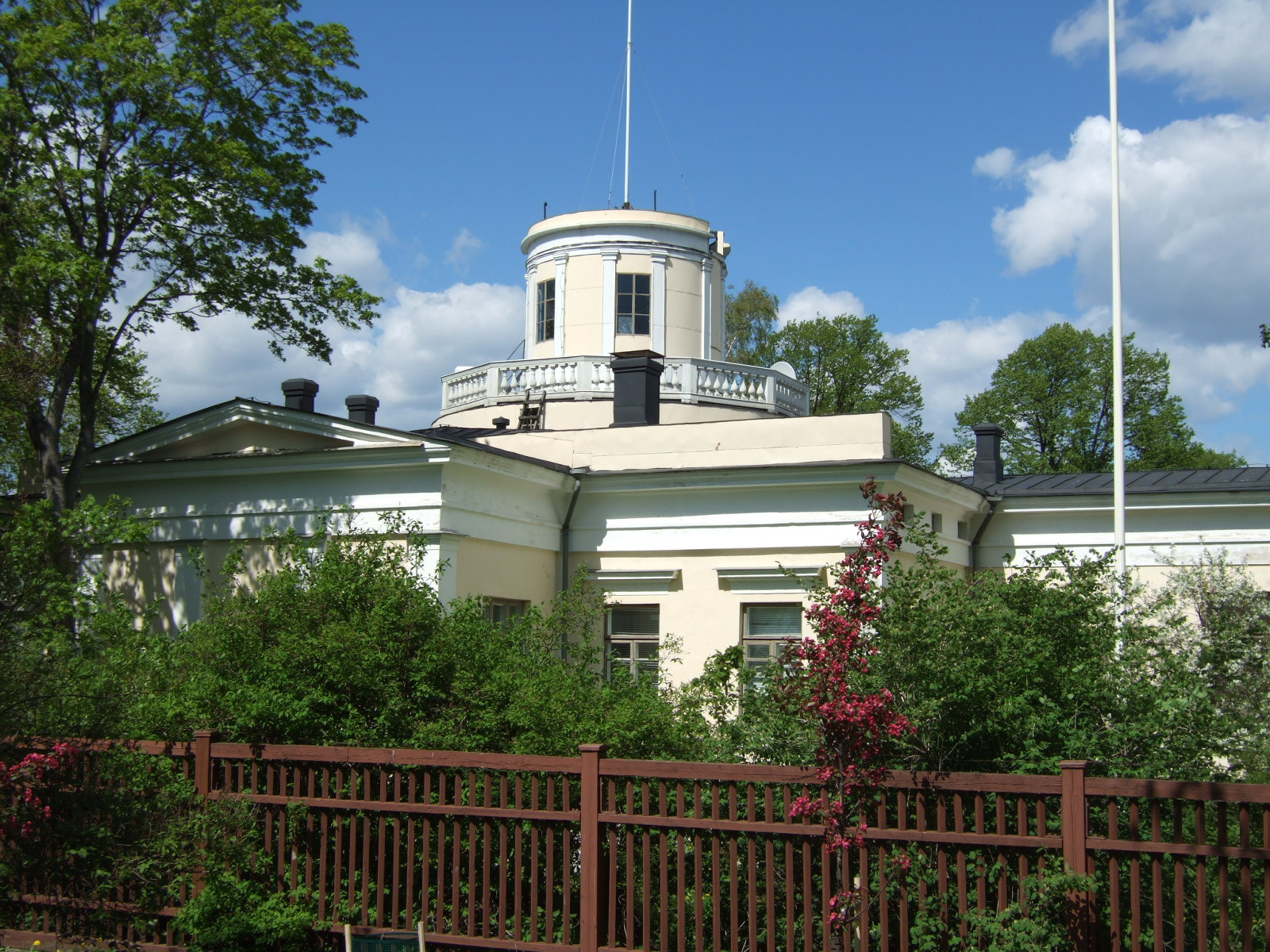
- Alternative names: Helsinki Observatory
- Organization: University of Helsinki
- Observatory code: 569
- Location: Helsinki, Finland
- Coordinates: 60°09′42″N 024°57′18″E
- Altitude: 33.0 metres (108.3 ft)
- Established: 1834
- Website: http://www.observatorio.fi/english/

Telescopes
- Argelander's refractor: 0.176 meter refractor
- Double refractor: 0.33 meter double refractor
- unnamed: 0.35 Cassegrain telescope
- Small Radio Telescope: 3 meter radio telescope
- Related media on Commons

Helsinki University Observatory housed the Department of Astronomy at the University of Helsinki, south Finland until end of 2009. It is now an astronomy-themed visitor centre and museum.

== History ==
The Helsinki astronomical observatory was designed in cooperation by professor Friedrich Wilhelm Argelander and architect Carl Ludvig Engel. The building was finished in 1834. Its instruments and astronomical books had escaped the great fire in Turku and were then transferred to Helsinki. The observatory was among the most modern astronomical observatories of its time, and served as an example for several European observatories that were built afterwards, most notably Pulkovo Observatory.

A separate tower was built in the observatory garden for a telescope designed for astrophotography. This building was finished in 1890. It houses the double refractor: two 0.33 meter refractor telescopes mounted together. One of the telescopes is built to be fitted with an eyepiece and the other with a photographic plate.

The observatory is located in the city centre and has not been in active use since the mid-20th century. Another observatory with a 60-centimeter telescope was built in Metsähovi, Kirkkonummi in the 1970s. The Metsähovi Radio Observatory was built around the same time and is the centre for the radio astronomical research of Aalto University.

The Department of Astronomy was merged into the Department of Physics at the beginning of 2010 and the astronomers moved to the Kumpula campus. The observatory building was thoroughly renovated and re-opened as a museum and visitor centre in 2012. The building also now houses the amateur astronomy association Ursa.

== See also ==
- List of astronomical observatories
- Metsähovi Radio Observatory
- Tuorla Observatory
