= Metric-affine gravitation theory =

Mathematical formulation of gravity theory with a general affine connection

In theoretical physics and mathematical physics, a metric-affine gravitation theory is a mathematical formulation of the theory of gravity involving a general affine connection on the world manifold (that is, a general linear connection on the tangent bundle), in addition to a pseudo-Riemannian metric. This is in contrast to standard formulations of General Relativity, in which the affine connection is the Levi-Civita connection associated to the metric. Metric-affine gravitation theory has been suggested as a natural generalization of Einstein–Cartan theory, another alternative formulation of gravity in which the affine connection is allowed to have non-zero torsion but must still preserve the metric.

== As a gauge theory ==
Metric-affine gravitation theory comes from gauge gravitation theory where a general linear connection plays the role of a gauge field. Let $TX$ be the tangent bundle over a manifold $X$ provided with bundle coordinates $(x^\mu,\dot x^\mu)$. A general linear connection on $TX$ is represented by a connection tangent-valued form:

$$\Gamma=dx^\lambda\otimes(\partial_\lambda +\Gamma_\lambda{}^\mu{}_\nu\dot x^\nu\dot\partial_\mu).$$

This connection is associated to a principal connection on the principal frame bundle $FX$ of frames in the tangent spaces to $X$ whose structure group is a general linear group $\mathrm{GL}(4,\R)$. Consequently, it can be treated as a gauge field. A pseudo-Riemannian metric $g=g_{\mu\nu}dx^\mu\otimes dx^\nu$ on $TX$ is defined as a global section of the quotient bundle $FX/\mathrm{SO}(1,3)\to X$, where $\mathrm{SO}(1,3)$ is the Lorentz group. Therefore, one can regard it as a classical Higgs field in gauge gravitation theory. Gauge symmetries of metric-affine gravitation theory are general covariant transformations.

== Dynamical variables ==
Given a pseudo-Riemannian metric $g$, any linear connection $\Gamma$ on $TX$ admits a splitting

$$\Gamma_{\mu\nu\alpha}=\{_{\mu\nu\alpha}\} +\frac12 C_{\mu\nu\alpha} + S_{\mu\nu\alpha}$$

into the Christoffel symbols

$$\{_{\mu\nu\alpha}\}= -\frac12(\partial_\mu g_{\nu\alpha} + \partial_\alpha
g_{\nu\mu}-\partial_\nu g_{\mu\alpha}),$$

a nonmetricity tensor

$$C_{\mu\nu\alpha}=C_{\mu\alpha\nu}=\nabla^\Gamma_\mu g_{\nu\alpha}=\partial_\mu g_{\nu\alpha} +\Gamma_{\mu\nu\alpha} + \Gamma_{\mu\alpha\nu},$$

and a contorsion tensor

$$S_{\mu\nu\alpha}=-S_{\mu\alpha\nu}=\frac12(T_{\nu\mu\alpha} +T_{\nu\alpha\mu} + T_{\mu\nu\alpha}+ C_{\alpha\nu\mu} -C_{\nu\alpha\mu}),$$

where

$$T_{\mu\nu\alpha}=\frac12(\Gamma_{\mu\nu\alpha} - \Gamma_{\alpha\nu\mu})$$

is the torsion tensor of $\Gamma$. Due to this splitting, metric-affine gravitation theory possesses a different collection of dynamical variables compared to General Relativity; namely, a pseudo-Riemannian metric, a non-metricity tensor and a torsion tensor. As a consequence, a Lagrangian of metric-affine gravitation theory can be expressed both in terms of the curvature of a connection $\Gamma$ and its torsion and non-metricity tensors. In particular, a metric-affine f(R) gravity, whose Lagrangian is an arbitrary function of a scalar curvature $R$ of $\Gamma$, is considered.

== Metricity and comparison to Einstein–Cartan theory ==
An affine connection $\Gamma$ is called a metric connection for a pseudo-Riemannian metric $g$ if it preserves $g$, i.e., the metricity condition

$$\nabla^\Gamma_\mu g_{\nu\alpha}=0$$

holds. A metric connection reads

$$\Gamma_{\mu\nu\alpha}=\{_{\mu\nu\alpha}\} + \frac12(T_{\nu\mu\alpha} +T_{\nu\alpha\mu} + T_{\mu\nu\alpha}).$$

For instance, the Levi-Civita connection in General Relativity is a metric connection; it is distinguished by being the unique such connection which is torsion-free.

A metric connection is associated to a principal connection on a Lorentz reduced subbundle $F^gX$ of the frame bundle $FX$ corresponding to a section $g$ of the quotient bundle $FX/\mathrm{SO}(1,3)\to X$. Restricted to metric connections, metric-affine gravitation theory comes to the above-mentioned Einstein–Cartan gravitation theory.

At the same time, any linear connection $\Gamma$ defines a principal adapted connection $\Gamma^g$ on a Lorentz reduced subbundle $F^gX$ by its restriction to a Lorentz subalgebra of the Lie algebra of the general linear group $\mathrm{GL}(4,\R)$. For instance, the Dirac operator in metric-affine gravitation theory in the presence of a general linear connection $\Gamma$ is well defined, and it depends only on the adapted connection $\Gamma^g$. Therefore, Einstein–Cartan gravitation theory can be formulated as a metric-affine one, without appealing to the metricity constraint.

In metric-affine gravitation theory, in comparison with the Einstein–Cartan one, the role of the matter source of a non-metricity tensor is played by the so-called hypermomentum, e.g., a Noether current of a scaling symmetry.

== See also ==
- Gauge gravitation theory
- Einstein–Cartan theory
- Affine gauge theory
- Classical unified field theories
