= Affine gauge theory =

Gauge theory with affine connections

In mathematical physics, an affine gauge theory is a classical gauge theory in which the gauge fields are affine connections on the tangent bundle over a smooth manifold $X$. Examples include the gauge theory of dislocations in continuous media (with $X=\mathbb R^3$) and the generalization of metric-affine gravitation theory (where $X$ is a world manifold). The latter can be used to formulate a theory of a fifth force.

== Affine tangent bundle ==
Being a vector bundle, the tangent bundle $TX$ of an $n$-dimensional manifold $X$ admits a natural structure of an affine bundle $ATX$, called the affine tangent bundle, possessing bundle atlases with affine transition functions. It is associated to a principal bundle $AFX$ of affine frames in tangent space over $X$, whose structure group is a general affine group $GA(n,\mathbb R)$.

The tangent bundle $TX$ is associated to a principal linear frame bundle $FX$, whose structure group is a general linear group $GL(n,\mathbb R)$. This is a subgroup of $GA(n,\mathbb R)$ so that the latter is a semidirect product of $GL(n,\mathbb R)$ and a group $T^n$ of translations.

There is the canonical imbedding of $FX$ to $AFX$ onto a reduced principal subbundle which corresponds to the canonical structure of a vector bundle $TX$ as the affine one.

Given linear bundle coordinates

$$(x^\mu,\dot x^\mu), \qquad \dot x'^\mu=\frac{\partial x'^\mu}{\partial x^\nu}\dot x^\nu, \qquad\qquad (1)$$

on the tangent bundle $TX$, the affine tangent bundle can be provided with affine bundle coordinates

$$(x^\mu,\widetilde x^\mu=\dot x^\mu +a^\mu(x^\alpha)), \qquad  \widetilde x'^\mu=\frac{\partial x'^\mu}{\partial x^\nu}\widetilde x^\nu + b^\mu(x^\alpha). \qquad\qquad (2)$$

and, in particular, with the linear coordinates (1).

== Affine gauge fields ==
The affine tangent bundle $ATX$ admits an affine connection $A$ which is associated to a principal connection on an affine frame bundle $AFX$. In affine gauge theory, it is treated as an affine gauge field.

Given the linear bundle coordinates (1) on $ATX=TX$, an affine connection $A$ is represented by a connection tangent-valued form

$$A=dx^\lambda\otimes[\partial_\lambda + (\Gamma_\lambda{}^\mu{}_\nu(x^\alpha)\dot x^\nu+\sigma_\lambda^\mu(x^\alpha))\dot\partial_\mu].\qquad \qquad (3)$$

This affine connection defines a unique linear connection

$$\Gamma =dx^\lambda\otimes[\partial_\lambda + \Gamma_\lambda{}^\mu{}_\nu(x^\alpha)\dot x^\nu\dot\partial_\mu] \qquad\qquad (4)$$

on $TX$, which is associated to a principal connection on $FX$.

Conversely, every linear connection $\Gamma$ (4) on $TX\to X$ is extended to the affine one $A\Gamma$ on $ATX$ which is given by the same expression (4) as $\Gamma$ with respect to the bundle coordinates (1) on $ATX=TX$, but it takes a form

$$A\Gamma =dx^\lambda\otimes[\partial_\lambda + (\Gamma_\lambda{}^\mu{}_\nu(x^\alpha)\widetilde x^\nu + s_\lambda^\mu(x^\alpha))\widetilde\partial_\mu], \qquad s_\lambda^\mu = - \Gamma_\lambda{}^\mu{}_\nu a^\nu +\partial_\lambda a^\mu,$$

relative to the affine coordinates (2).

Then any affine connection $A$ (3) on $ATX\to X$ is represented by a sum

$$A=A\Gamma +\sigma \qquad\qquad (5)$$

of the extended linear connection $A\Gamma$ and a basic soldering form

$$\sigma=\sigma_\lambda^\mu(x^\alpha)dx^\lambda\otimes\partial_\mu \qquad\qquad (6)$$

on $TX$, where $\dot \partial_\mu= \partial_\mu$ due to the canonical isomorphism $VATX=ATX\times_X TX$ of the vertical tangent bundle $VATX$ of $ATX$.

Relative to the linear coordinates (1), the sum (5) is brought into a sum $A=\Gamma +\sigma$ of a linear connection $\Gamma$ and the soldering form $\sigma$ (6). In this case, the soldering form $\sigma$ (6) often is treated as a translation gauge field, though it is not a connection.

Let us note that a true translation gauge field (i.e., an affine connection which yields a flat linear connection on $TX$) is well defined only on a parallelizable manifold $X$.

== Gauge theory of dislocations ==
In field theory, one meets a problem of physical interpretation of translation gauge fields because there are no fields subject to gauge translations $u(x) \to u(x) + a(x)$. At the same time, one observes such a field in gauge theory of dislocations in continuous media because, in the presence of dislocations, displacement vectors $u^k$, $k = 1,2,3$, of small deformations are determined only with accuracy to gauge translations $u^k \to u^k + a^k(x)$.

In this case, let $X=\mathbb R^3$, and let an affine connection take a form

$$A=dx^i\otimes(\partial_i + A^j_i(x^k)\widetilde\partial_j)$$

with respect to the affine bundle coordinates (2). This is a translation gauge field whose coefficients $A^j_l$ describe plastic distortion, covariant derivatives $D_j u^i =\partial_ju^i- A^i_j$ coincide with elastic distortion, and a strength $F^k_{ji}=\partial_j A^k_i - \partial_i A^k_j$ is a dislocation density.

Equations of gauge theory of dislocations are derived from a gauge invariant Lagrangian density

$$L_{(\sigma)} = \mu D_iu^kD^iu_k + \frac{\lambda}{2}(D_iu^i)^2 - \epsilon F^k{}_{ij}F_k{}^{ij},$$

where $\mu$ and $\lambda$ are the Lamé parameters of isotropic media. These equations however are not independent since a displacement field $u^k(x)$ can be removed by gauge translations and, thereby, it fails to be a dynamic variable.

== Gauge theory of the fifth force ==
In gauge gravitation theory on a world manifold $X$, one can consider an affine, but not linear connection on the tangent bundle $TX$ of $X$. Given bundle coordinates (1) on $TX$, it takes the form (3) where the linear connection $\Gamma$ (4) and the basic soldering form $\sigma$ (6) are considered as independent variables.

As was mentioned above, the soldering form $\sigma$ (6) often is treated as a translation gauge field, though it is not a connection. On another side, one mistakenly identifies $\sigma$ with a tetrad field. However, these are different mathematical object because a soldering form is a section of the tensor bundle $TX\otimes T^*X$, whereas a tetrad field is a local section of a Lorentz reduced subbundle of a frame bundle $FX$.

In the spirit of the above-mentioned gauge theory of dislocations, it has been suggested that a soldering field $\sigma$ can describe sui generi deformations of a world manifold $X$ which are given by a bundle morphism

$$s: TX\ni \partial_\lambda\to \partial_\lambda\rfloor (\theta +\sigma) =(\delta_\lambda^\nu+ \sigma_\lambda^\nu)\partial_\nu\in TX,$$

where $\theta=dx^\mu\otimes \partial_\mu$ is a tautological one-form.

One can then consider a metric-affine gravitation theory $(g,\Gamma)$ on a deformed world manifold with a deformed pseudo-Riemannian metric $\widetilde g^{\mu\nu}=s^\mu_\alpha s^\nu_\beta g^{\alpha\beta}$ where the Lagrangian of the soldering field $\sigma$ takes the form

$$L_{(\sigma)}=\frac12[a_1T^\mu{}_{\nu\mu} T_\alpha{}^{\nu\alpha}+
a_2T_{\mu\nu\alpha}T^{\mu\nu\alpha}+a_3T_{\mu\nu\alpha}T^{\nu\mu\alpha} +a_4\epsilon^{\mu\nu\alpha\beta}T^\gamma{}_{\mu\gamma}
T_{\beta\nu\alpha}-\mu\sigma^\mu{}_\nu\sigma^\nu{}_\mu+
\lambda\sigma^\mu{}_\mu \sigma^\nu{}_\nu]\sqrt{-g}$$,

where $\epsilon^{\mu\nu\alpha\beta}$ is the Levi-Civita symbol, and

$$T^\alpha{}_{\nu\mu}=D_\nu\sigma^\alpha{}_\mu  -D_\mu\sigma^\alpha{}_\nu$$

is the torsion of a linear connection $\Gamma$ with respect to the soldering form $\sigma$. In the case of small gravitational and soldering fields whose matter source is a point mass, one obtains a modified Newtonian potential of the fifth force type.

== See also ==
- Connection (affine bundle)
- Dislocations
- Fifth force
- Gauge gravitation theory
- Metric-affine gravitation theory
- Classical unified field theories
