= General Theory =

General theory may refer to:

- Generalized theory of gravitation
- General theory of relativity
- General systems theory
- Generalized cohomology theory
- The General Theory of Employment, Interest and Money, a 1936 book written by John Maynard Keynes
