= Einstein group =

Albert Einstein, in searching for the transformation group for his unified field theory, wrote:

"Every attempt to establish a unified field theory must start, in my opinion, from a group of transformations which is no less general than that of the continuous transformations of the four coordinates. For we should hardly be successful in looking for the subsequent enlargement of the group for a theory based on a narrower group."

== The Poincaré group ==
The Poincaré group, the transformation group of special relativity, being orthogonal, the inverse of a transformation equals its transpose, introducing discrete reflections. This, in turn, violates Einstein's dictum for a group "no less general than that of the continuous transformations of the four coordinates". Specifically, any pair of Euler angles θ_{k} and −θ_{k} are not independent, nor are any pair of boosts v_{k}/c and −v_{k}/c. Available parameters are thus reduced, from the 16 needed to express all transformations in a curved spacetime, per the general principle of relativity, ∂x^{μ′}/∂x^{ν}, to the 10 of the Poincaré group.

== The Einstein group ==
Mendel Sachs, in the 1960s, found the transformation group that Einstein had sought, the "Einstein" group. The Einstein group can be obtained by factorizing the squared spacetime invariant interval

ds^{2} = g_{μν} dx^{μ} dx^{ν}

into a quaternion-valued form and its conjugate, ds ds*, where

ds = q_{μ}(x) dx^{μ}

and q_{μ}(x) is a four-vector of Hermitian quaternions.

Note that the Einstein group approaches—but never reaches—the Poincare group as the flat spacetime (special relativity limit) is approached.
