= Grothendieck connection =

In algebraic geometry and synthetic differential geometry, a Grothendieck connection is a way of viewing connections in terms of descent data from infinitesimal neighbourhoods of the diagonal.

== Introduction and motivation ==
The Grothendieck connection is a generalization of the Gauss–Manin connection constructed in a manner analogous to that in which the Ehresmann connection generalizes the Koszul connection. The construction itself must satisfy a requirement of geometric invariance, which may be regarded as the analog of covariance for a wider class of structures including the schemes of algebraic geometry. Thus the connection in a certain sense must live in a natural sheaf on a Grothendieck topology. In this section, we discuss how to describe an Ehresmann connection in sheaf-theoretic terms as a Grothendieck connection.

Let $M$ be a manifold and $\pi : E \to M$ a surjective submersion, so that $E$ is a manifold fibred over $M.$ Let $J^1(M, E)$ be the first-order jet bundle of sections of $E.$ This may be regarded as a bundle over $M$ or a bundle over the total space of $E.$ With the latter interpretation, an Ehresmann connection is a section of the bundle (over $E$) $J^1(M, E) \to E.$ The problem is thus to obtain an intrinsic description of the sheaf of sections of this vector bundle.

Grothendieck's solution is to consider the diagonal embedding $\Delta : M \to M \times M.$ The sheaf $I$ of ideals of $\Delta$ in $M \times M$ consists of functions on $M \times M$ which vanish along the diagonal. Much of the infinitesimal geometry of $M$ can be realized in terms of $I.$ For instance, $\Delta^*\left(I, I^2\right)$ is the sheaf of sections of the cotangent bundle. One may define a first-order infinitesimal neighborhood $M^{(2)}$ of $\Delta$ in $M \times M$ to be the subscheme corresponding to the sheaf of ideals $I^2.$ (See below for a coordinate description.)

There are a pair of projections $p_1, p_2 : M \times M \to M$ given by projection the respective factors of the Cartesian product, which restrict to give projections $p_1, p_2 : M^{(2)} \to M.$ One may now form the pullback of the fibre space $E$ along one or the other of $p_1$ or $p_2.$ In general, there is no canonical way to identify $p_1^* E$ and $p_2^* E$ with each other. A Grothendieck connection is a specified isomorphism between these two spaces. One may proceed to define curvature and p-curvature of a connection in the same language.

== See also ==
- Connection (mathematics) – Function in mathematics
