= Bundle (mathematics) =

Generalization of a fiber bundle

In mathematics, a bundle is a generalization of a fiber bundle dropping the condition of a local product structure. The requirement of a local product structure rests on the bundle having a topology. Without this requirement, more general objects can be considered bundles. For example, one can consider a bundle π: E → B with E and B sets. It is no longer true that the preimages $\pi^{-1}(x)$ must all look alike, unlike fiber bundles, where the fibers must all be isomorphic (in the case of vector bundles) and homeomorphic.

== Definition ==
A bundle is a triple (E, p, B) where E, B are sets and p : E → B is a map.

- E is called the total space
- B is the base space of the bundle
- p is the projection

This definition of a bundle is quite unrestrictive. For instance, the empty function defines a bundle. Nonetheless it serves well to introduce the basic terminology, and every type of bundle has the basic ingredients of above with restrictions on E, p, B and usually there is additional structure.

For each b ∈ B, p^{−1}(b) is the fibre or fiber of the bundle over b.

A bundle (E*, p*, B*) is a subbundle of (E, p, B) if B* ⊂ B, E* ⊂ E and p* = p|_{E*}.

A cross section is a map s : B → E such that p(s(b)) = b for each b ∈ B, that is, s(b) ∈ p^{−1}(b).

== Examples ==
- If E and B are smooth manifolds and p is smooth, surjective and in addition a submersion, then the bundle is a fibered manifold. Here and in the following examples, the smoothness condition may be weakened to continuous or sharpened to analytic, or it could be anything reasonable, like continuously differentiable (C^{1}), in between.
- If for each two points b_{1} and b_{2} in the base, the corresponding fibers p^{−1}(b_{1}) and p^{−1}(b_{2}) are homotopy equivalent, then the bundle is a fibration.
- If for each two points b_{1} and b_{2} in the base, the corresponding fibers p^{−1}(b_{1}) and p^{−1}(b_{2}) are homeomorphic, and in addition the bundle satisfies certain conditions of local triviality outlined in the pertaining linked articles, then the bundle is a fiber bundle. Usually there is additional structure, e.g. a group structure or a vector space structure, on the fibers besides a topology. Then is required that the homeomorphism is an isomorphism with respect to that structure, and the conditions of local triviality are sharpened accordingly.
- A principal bundle is a fiber bundle endowed with a right group action with certain properties. One example of a principal bundle is the frame bundle.
- If for each two points b_{1} and b_{2} in the base, the corresponding fibers p^{−1}(b_{1}) and p^{−1}(b_{2}) are vector spaces of the same dimension, then the bundle is a vector bundle if the appropriate conditions of local triviality are satisfied. The tangent bundle is an example of a vector bundle.

== Bundle objects ==
More generally, bundles or bundle objects can be defined in any category: in a category C, a bundle is simply an epimorphism π: E → B. If the category is not concrete, then the notion of a preimage of the map is not necessarily available. Therefore these bundles may have no fibers at all, although for sufficiently well behaved categories they do; for instance, for a category with pullbacks and a terminal object 1 the points of B can be identified with morphisms p:1→B and the fiber of p is obtained as the pullback of p and π. The category of bundles over B is a subcategory of the slice category (C↓B) of objects over B, while the category of bundles without fixed base object is a subcategory of the comma category (C↓C) which is also the functor category C², the category of morphisms in C.

The category of smooth vector bundles is a bundle object over the category of smooth manifolds in Cat, the category of small categories. The functor taking each manifold to its tangent bundle is an example of a section of this bundle object.

== See also ==
- Fiber bundle
- Fibration
- Fibered manifold
