= Mendel Sachs =

American theoretical physicist (1927–2012)

- Born: April 13, 1927; Portland, Oregon, United States
- Died: May 5, 2012 (aged 85); Buffalo, New York, United States
- Education: University of California, Los Angeles (AB, 1949); University of California, Los Angeles (MA, 1950); Columbia University; University of California, Los Angeles (PhD, 1954)
- Known for: Unified field theory
- Spouse: Yetty Herman (m. 1952)
- Children: 4
- Scientific career
- Fields: Theoretical physics; General relativity; Elementary particles; Philosophy of physics
- Workplaces: University of California Radiation Laboratory, Livermore; University of California Radiation Laboratory, Berkeley; Lockheed Missiles and Space Laboratory; San Jose State College; McGill University; Boston University; State University of New York Buffalo
- Thesis: Interactions in Paramagnetic Salts (1954)
- Doctoral advisor: Hideki Yukawa; Robert Finkelstein

Mendel Sachs (/zɑːks/; April 13, 1927 – May 5, 2012) was an American theoretical physicist. His scientific work includes the proposal of a unified field theory that brings together the weak force, strong force, electromagnetism, and gravity.

== Biography ==
=== Early life and education ===
Sachs was born in Portland, Oregon, the third son of a rabbi. When just four months old, Sachs moved with his family to Toronto, Canada, where he grew up and attended school.

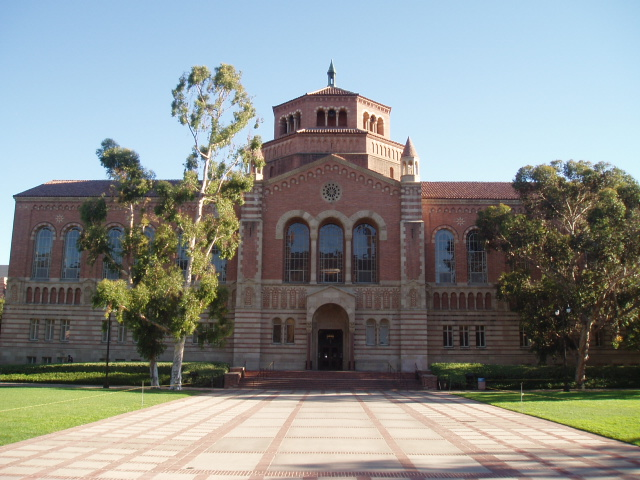
Powell Library, UCLA. Sachs completed his AB, MA and PhD at UCLA.

In March 1945, when Sachs was 17 years old, he enlisted to serve in the US Navy during World War II. The Sachs family moved back to the United States to Los Angeles where other family members had already moved from Portland. From middle of 1945 onward, Sachs considered Los Angeles to be his hometown. After the war, in August 1945 Sachs enrolled in the Navy Eddy program in Chicago learning about electronics and radar equipment. He was then assigned to an aircraft carrier based in San Francisco that had been badly damaged in the war by a kamikaze airplane. In July 1946, Sachs spoke with the executive officer of the ship, explaining that he wanted to go to college and study physics and received an early honorable discharge from the Navy in August 1946.

Sachs earned his bachelor's degree at the University of California, Los Angeles, he then moved to Columbia University, New York for postgraduate study. Sachs had heard of the research at Columbia University while at UCLA. During that time Columbia's physics department was chaired by Isidor Isaac Rabi and was home to two Nobel laureates (Rabi and Enrico Fermi) and seven future laureates (Polykarp Kusch, Willis Lamb, Maria Goeppert-Mayer, James Rainwater, Norman Ramsey, Charles Townes and Hideki Yukawa) While at Columbia Sachs was taught by Willis Lamb and Hideki Yukawa. Yukawa had agreed to be Sach's thesis advisor, but Sachs decided to complete his doctorate back at UCLA so that he could be reunited with Yetty Herman, whom he married in 1952.

=== Career ===
Following the award of his PhD in 1954 Sachs first post-doctoral position was at the new University of California Radiation Laboratory at both Berkeley and Livermore, which was run by Edward Teller and Ernest Lawrence and was also home to Bryce DeWitt, who Sachs would later co-author articles with in Physics Today. The new laboratory was intended to spur innovation and provide competition to the nuclear weapon design laboratory at Los Alamos in New Mexico, home of the Manhattan Project that developed the first atomic weapons. In his new job Sachs intended to get in contact with Albert Einstein at his office at the Institute for Advanced Study, Princeton to arrange an appointment to discuss his research program. Sachs wanted to explore with him the features of nonlocality and nonlinearity that are absent in the quantum theory, but must be present in a field theory. Unfortunately Einstein died in April 1955 and Sachs never had the opportunity to talk to him about his ideas.

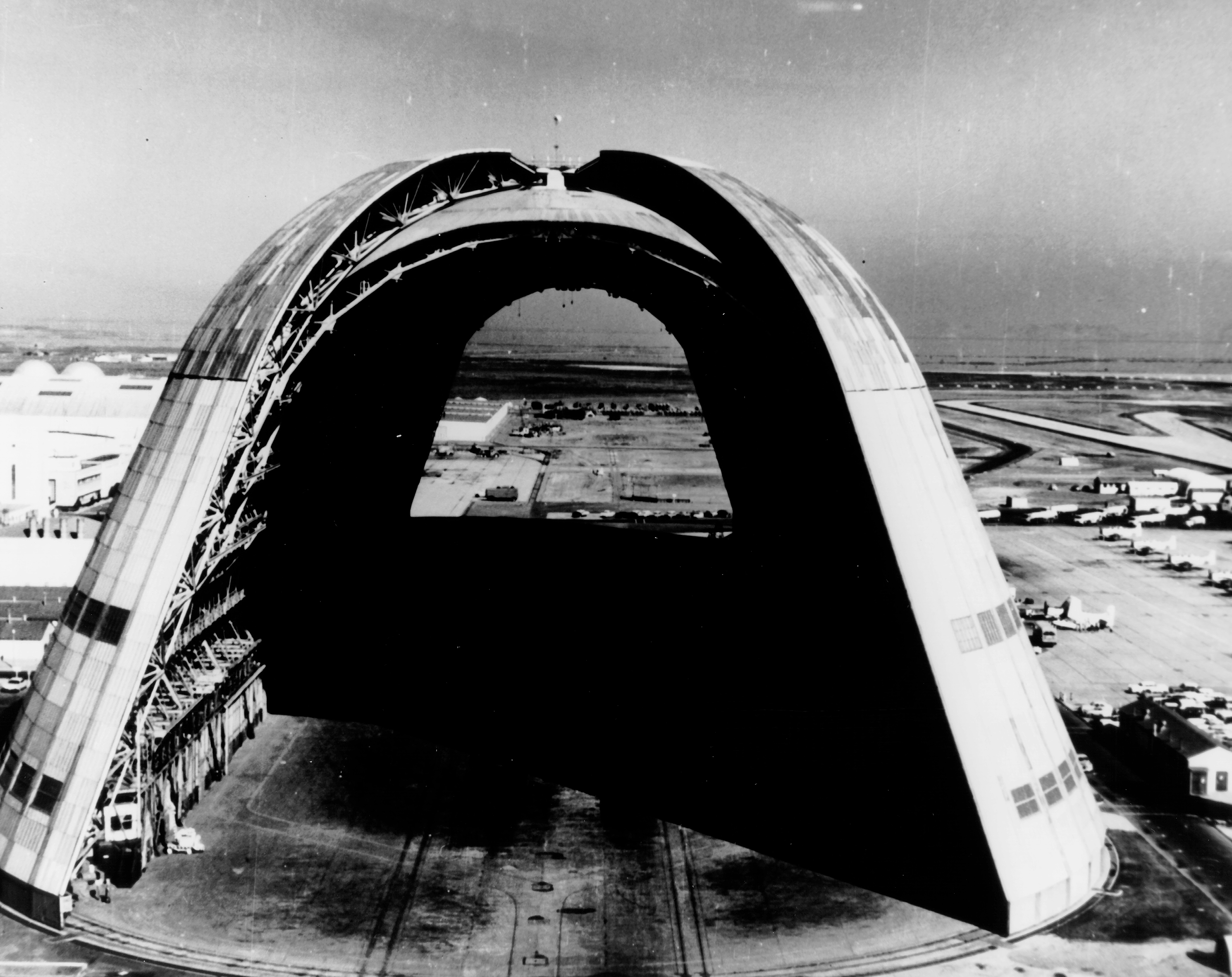
Hangar One where Lockheed Missiles and Space Company was under contract to construct the first nuclear stage rocket engine.

In 1956, Sachs became a senior scientist at Lockheed Missiles and Space Laboratory, Based in Sunnyvale and adjacent to the NASA-Marshall Space Flight Center, Moffett Field, Lockheed Martin Missiles and Space Systems was and continues to be one of the most important satellite development and manufacturing plants in the United States, covering 412 acres. While at Lockheed Sachs began developing with Solomon Schwebel a field theory of quantum electrodynamics that included broken symmetries that did not require recourse to renormalization or perturbation techniques – the "Schwebel-Sachs" model. During this time Sachs was also employed as assistant professor of physics at San Jose State College. In 1961, he became a research professor at McGill University; this was followed by a post as associate professor of physics at Boston University (1962–1966).

In 1964, while at Boston University Sachs received an invitation from Paul Dirac to visit Cambridge University. Sachs, his wife and children first stayed for one month in Ireland, at the Dublin Institute for Advanced Studies where Sachs discuss various problems with Cornelius Lanczos, who had been one of Einstein's assistants in Berlin in the 1920s. Sachs also had discussions with Lanczos' colleagues John Lighton Synge, J. R. McConnell and Lochlainn O'Raifeartaigh. Following his trip to Ireland, Sachs stayed in England for three months, where his wife Yetty had family. Sachs worked with Paul Dirac at the Department of Applied Mathematics and Theoretical Physics, Cambridge University. While working with Dirac, Sachs also had the opportunity to discuss ideas with John G. Taylor, John Polkinghorne and graduate students at DAMTP.

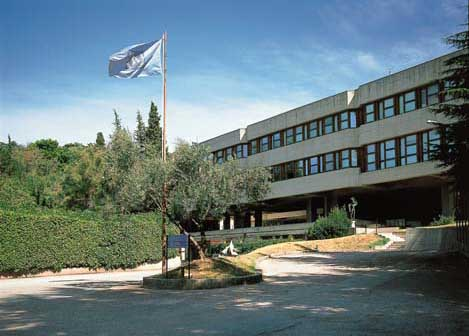
Abdus Salam International Centre for Theoretical Physics, where Sachs published his unified field theory.

In 1965, Sachs had had a breakthrough while at the Aspen Center for Physics, Colorado. Sachs was able to derive a result for a unified field theory if quantum mechanics was considered to be a linear approximation for a field theory of inertia expressed in general relativity. Sachs argued that the work of Albert Einstein and Erwin Schrödinger in general relativity did not yet take account of the inertia of matter, which required consideration of the Mach principle. In the summer of 1966 Abdus Salam invited Sachs to spend a few months at the International Centre for Theoretical Physics, in Trieste, Italy. During this time Sachs published the details of his formal structure of quantum mechanics from a generally covariant field theory of inertia in the Italian journal, Il Nuovo Cimento.

In the fall of 1966, he was appointed professor of physics at State University of New York at Buffalo.

Sachs was an editor for the International Journal of Theoretical Physics.

On his retirement in 1997 he was given the title Professor of Physics Emeritus. A symposium was held in Sachs honour to mark his retirement, the event was attended by Nobel laureates Willis E. Lamb and Herbert A. Hauptman and a subsequent festschrift was published. Sachs published 13 books and over 200 journal articles during his life.

== Research ==
=== Unified field theory ===
Sachs progressed towards completing Albert Einstein's unified field theory, i.e. unifying the fields in general relativity, from which quantum mechanics emerges under certain conditions.

His theory rests on three axioms. The general idea is (1) to make precise the principle of relativity, aka general covariance. To do this, Sachs found, requires (2) generalizing Einstein's Mach principle, positing that all manifestations of matter, not only inertial mass, derive from the interaction of matter. From this, (3) quantum mechanics can be seen to emerge via the correspondence principle, as a nonrelativistic approximation for a theory of inertia in relativity.

The result is a continuous quaternion-based formalism modeling all manifestations of matter. Sachs called the transformation symmetry group that Einstein sought in completing general covariance 'the Einstein group', which approaches the Poincaré group towards the flat spacetime of special relativity. Sachs described how quantum mechanics, first in relativistic two-component spinor form, and then under low energy–momentum as the Schrödinger equation emerges therefrom. Quoting Sachs, "... by dropping the (unnecessary) space and time reflection symmetry elements from Einstein's field equations, they factorize from 10 independent relations to 16 independent relations. This generalization then yielded a unified field theory of gravitation and electromagnetism. This factorization is entirely analogous to Dirac's factorization of the Klein Gordon equation to yield the special relativistic spinor form of Schrödinger's wave mechanics".

"The well known trouble with RQFT", Sachs wrote, "is that when its formal expression is examined for its solutions, it is found that it does not have any! This is because of infinities that are automatically generated in this formulation". Through general relativity, he instead produced a myriad of theoretical results without resorting to arbitrary parameters or renormalization, some in closer agreement with experiment than derived from quantum field theory, e.g. for the Lamb splitting with N = 4.

Yet another phenomenon that Sachs' theory can accommodate (that standard cosmology might not) is the Huge-LQG large quasar group, since general relativity does not presuppose homogeneity or isotropy, i.e. the cosmological principle.

Sachs believed that fundamental incompatibilities between relativity theory and quantum theory preclude there from being a quantum theory of gravity.
