= Unified field theory =

Field theory in physics that aims to unify the fundamental forces and particles

In physics, a unified field theory (UFT) is a type of field theory that allows all fundamental forces of nature, including gravity, and all elementary particles to be written in terms of a single physical field. According to quantum field theory, particles are themselves the quanta of fields. Different fields in physics include vector fields such as the electromagnetic field, spinor fields whose quanta are fermionic particles such as electrons, and tensor fields such as the metric tensor field that describes the shape of spacetime and gives rise to gravitation in general relativity. Unified field theories attempt to organize these fields into a single mathematical structure.

For over a century, the unified field theory has remained an open line of research. The term was coined by Albert Einstein, who attempted to unify his general theory of relativity with electromagnetism beginning in the 1920s. Einstein attempted to create a classical unified field theory. Among other difficulties, this required a new explanation of particles as singularities or solitons instead of field quanta. Later attempts to unify general relativity with other forces incorporate quantum mechanics. The concept of a "Theory of Everything" or Grand Unified Theory are closely related to unified field theory. A theory of everything attempts to create a complete picture of all events in nature. Grand Unified Theories do not attempt to include the gravitational force and can therefore operate entirely within quantum field theory. The goal of a unified field theory has led to significant progress in theoretical physics.

== Introduction ==
Unified field theory attempts to give a single elegant description of the following fields:

=== Forces ===
All four of the known fundamental forces are mediated by fields. In the Standard Model of particle physics, three of these result from the exchange of gauge bosons. These are:

- Strong interaction: the interaction responsible for holding quarks together to form hadrons, and holding neutrons and also protons together to form atomic nuclei. The exchange particle that mediates this force is the gluon.
- Electromagnetic interaction: the familiar interaction that acts on electrically charged particles. The photon is the exchange particle for this force.
- Weak interaction: a short-range interaction responsible for some forms of radioactivity, that acts on electrons, neutrinos, and quarks. It is mediated by the W and Z bosons.

General relativity likewise describes gravitation as the result of the metric tensor field, which describes the shape of spacetime:

- Gravitational interaction: a long-range attractive interaction that acts on all particles. In hypothetical quantum versions of GR, the postulated exchange particle has been named the graviton.

=== Matter ===
In the Standard Model, the "matter" particles (electrons, quarks, neutrinos, etc) are described as the quanta of spinor fields. Gauge boson fields also have quanta, such as photons for the electromagnetic field.

=== Higgs ===
The Standard Model has a unique fundamental scalar field, the Higgs field, the quanta of which are called Higgs bosons.

== History ==
=== Classic theory ===
The first successful classical unified field theory was developed by James Clerk Maxwell. In 1820, Hans Christian Ørsted discovered that electric currents exerted forces on magnets, while in 1831, Michael Faraday made the observation that time-varying magnetic fields could induce electric currents. Until then, electricity and magnetism had been thought of as unrelated phenomena. In 1864, Maxwell published his famous paper on a dynamical theory of the electromagnetic field. This was the first example of a theory that was able to encompass previously separate field theories (namely electricity and magnetism) to provide a unifying theory of electromagnetism. By 1905, Albert Einstein had used the constancy of the speed-of-light in Maxwell's theory to unify our notions of space and time into an entity we now call spacetime. In 1915, he expanded this theory of special relativity to a description of gravity, general relativity, using a field to describe the curving geometry of four-dimensional (4D) spacetime.

In the years following the creation of the general theory, a large number of physicists and mathematicians enthusiastically participated in the attempt to unify the then-known fundamental interactions. Given later developments in this domain, of particular interest are the theories of Hermann Weyl of 1919, who introduced the concept of an (electromagnetic) gauge field in a classical field theory and, two years later, that of Theodor Kaluza, who extended General Relativity to five dimensions. Continuing in this latter direction, Oscar Klein proposed in 1926 that the fourth spatial dimension be curled up into a small, unobserved circle. In Kaluza–Klein theory, the gravitational curvature of the extra spatial direction behaves as an additional force similar to electromagnetism. These and other models of electromagnetism and gravity were pursued by Albert Einstein in his attempts at a classical unified field theory. By 1930 Einstein had already considered the Einstein-Maxwell–Dirac System [Dongen]. This system is (heuristically) the super-classical [Varadarajan] limit of (the not mathematically well-defined) quantum electrodynamics. One can extend this system to include the weak and strong nuclear forces to get the Einstein–Yang-Mills–Dirac System. The French physicist Marie-Antoinette Tonnelat published a paper in the early 1940s on the standard commutation relations for the quantized spin-2 field, in an attempt to unify general relativity with quantum mechanics. She continued this work in collaboration with Erwin Schrödinger after World War II. In the 1960s Mendel Sachs proposed a generally covariant field theory that did not require recourse to renormalization or perturbation theory. In 1965, Tonnelat published a book on the state of research on unified field theories.

=== Modern progress ===
In 1963, American physicist Sheldon Glashow proposed that the weak nuclear force, electricity, and magnetism could arise from a partially unified electroweak theory. In 1967, Pakistani Abdus Salam and American Steven Weinberg independently revised Glashow's theory by having the masses for the W particle and Z particle arise through spontaneous symmetry breaking with the Higgs mechanism. This unified theory modelled the electroweak interaction as a force mediated by four particles: the photon for the electromagnetic aspect, a neutral Z particle, and two charged W particles for the weak aspect. As a result of the spontaneous symmetry breaking, the weak force becomes short-range and the W and Z bosons acquire masses of 80.4 and 91.2 GeV/c^{2}, respectively. Their theory was first given experimental support by the discovery of weak neutral currents in 1973. In 1983, the Z and W bosons were first produced at CERN by Carlo Rubbia's team. For their insights, Glashow, Salam, and Weinberg were awarded the Nobel Prize in Physics in 1979. Carlo Rubbia and Simon van der Meer received the Prize in 1984.

After Gerardus 't Hooft showed the Glashow–Weinberg–Salam electroweak interactions to be mathematically consistent, the electroweak theory became a template for further attempts at unifying forces. In 1974, Sheldon Glashow and Howard Georgi proposed unifying the strong and electroweak interactions into the Georgi–Glashow model, the first Grand Unified Theory, which would have observable effects for energies much above 100 GeV.

Since then there have been numerous proposals for Grand Unified Theories involving larger and larger unifying groups. While these theories are self-consistent, no proposal produced a solution to outstanding issues in cosmology, like the baryon asymmetry problem or the missing mass now attributed to dark matter. Experimental tests of such theories requires an energy scale well beyond the reach of current accelerators so no empirical evidence outside of cosmology can guide theory.

Grand Unified Theories make predictions for the relative strengths of the strong, weak, and electromagnetic forces, and in 1991 LEP determined that supersymmetric theories have the correct ratio of couplings for a Georgi–Glashow Grand Unified Theory. Many Grand Unified Theories (but not Pati–Salam) predict that the proton can decay, and if this were to be seen, details of the decay products could give hints at more aspects of the Grand Unified Theory. It is at present unknown if the proton can decay, although experiments have determined a lower bound of 10^{35} years for its lifetime.

=== Current status ===
Theoretical physicists have not yet formulated a widely accepted, consistent theory that combines general relativity and quantum mechanics to form a theory of everything. Trying to combine the graviton with the strong and electroweak interactions leads to fundamental difficulties and the resulting theory is not renormalizable. The incompatibility of the two theories remains an outstanding problem in the field of physics.

== See also ==
- Sheldon Glashow
- Unification of theories in physics
- Grand Unified Theory
- Theory of everything
