= Nonmetricity tensor =

Covariant derivative of the metric tensor

In mathematics, the nonmetricity tensor in differential geometry is the covariant derivative of the metric tensor. It can be interpreted as the failure of a connection to parallelly transport the metric. Physically, this corresponds to the failure of the metric to preserve angles and lengths under parallel transport.

== Definition ==
Let $M$ be a manifold equipped with a metric $g$, and let $\nabla$ be an affine connection on the tangent bundle $TM$. The nonmetricity tensor is defined (some authors use the opposite sign convention) as
$$Q(X,Y,Z) := (\nabla_X g)(Y,Z)$$
for $X,Y,Z$ arbitrary vector fields. In abstract index notation, this reads $Q_{abc} = \nabla_a g_{bc}$.

== Properties ==
It is manifestly symmetric in its latter two indices due to the symmetry of the metric, and carries $n^2 (n+1)/2$ independent components on an $n$-dimensional manifold.

One can additionally define the nonmetricity 1-forms either (and equivalently) by contracting the tensor with a basis 1-form on its first index, or by the exterior covariant derivative $D^\nabla$ associated with the connection $\nabla$ as
$$\mathbf{Q} = D^\nabla g$$
We say a connection is metric compatible (or sometimes just "metric") if the nonmetricity tensor associated with that connection vanishes.

The Levi-Civita connection is the unique metric compatible connection with vanishing torsion.

== Use in Physics ==
The triple $(M,g,\nabla)$ are the data for a metric affine spacetime.
