= Connection (fibered manifold) =

Operation on fibered manifolds

In differential geometry, the classical notion of a connection, usually encountered as a structure formalising the idea of parallel transport on a vector bundle, or more generally on a fiber bundle, can be further generalised to that of a connection on a fibered manifold. A fibered manifold is a surjective submersion of smooth manifolds Y → X. Since fiber bundles are simply locally trivial fibered manifolds, the notion of a connection as discussed in this article provides a general framework which includes the more classical meaning.

== Formal definition ==
Let π : Y → X be a fibered manifold. A generalized connection on Y is a section Γ : Y → J^{1}Y, where J^{1}Y is the jet manifold of Y.

=== Connection as a horizontal splitting ===
With the above manifold π there is the following canonical short exact sequence of vector bundles over Y:

$0\to \mathrm{V}Y\to \mathrm{T}Y\to Y\times_X \mathrm{T}X\to 0\,,$	1

where TY and TX are the tangent bundles of Y, respectively, VY is the vertical tangent bundle of Y, and Y ×_{X} TX is the pullback bundle of TX onto Y.

A connection on a fibered manifold Y → X is defined as a linear bundle morphism

$\Gamma: Y\times_X \mathrm{T}X \to \mathrm{T}Y$	2

over Y which splits the exact sequence 1. A connection always exists.

Sometimes, this connection Γ is called the Ehresmann connection because it yields the horizontal distribution

$$\mathrm{H}Y=\Gamma\left(Y\times_X \mathrm{T}X \right) \subset \mathrm{T}Y$$

of TY and its horizontal decomposition TY = VY ⊕ HY.

At the same time, by an Ehresmann connection also is meant the following construction. Any connection Γ on a fibered manifold Y → X yields a horizontal lift Γ ∘ τ of a vector field τ on X onto Y, but need not defines the similar lift of a path in X into Y. Let

$$\begin{align}\mathbb R\supset[,]\ni t&\to x(t)\in X \\ \mathbb R\ni t&\to y(t)\in Y\end{align}$$

be two smooth paths in X and Y, respectively. Then t → y(t) is called the horizontal lift of x(t) if

$$\pi(y(t))= x(t)\,, \qquad \dot y(t)\in \mathrm{H}Y \,, \qquad t\in\mathbb R\,.$$

A connection Γ is said to be the Ehresmann connection if, for each path x([0,1]) in X, there exists its horizontal lift through any point y ∈ π^{−1}(x([0,1])). A fibered manifold is a fiber bundle if and only if it admits such an Ehresmann connection.

=== Connection as a tangent-valued form ===
Given a fibered manifold Y → X, let it be endowed with an atlas of fibered coordinates (x^{μ}, y^{i}), and let Γ be a connection on Y → X. It yields uniquely the horizontal tangent-valued one-form

$\Gamma = dx^\mu\otimes \left(\partial_\mu + \Gamma_\mu^i\left(x^\nu, y^j\right)\partial_i\right)$	3

on Y which projects onto the canonical tangent-valued form (tautological one-form or solder form)

$$\theta_X=dx^\mu\otimes\partial_\mu$$

on X, and vice versa. With this form, the horizontal splitting 2 reads

$$\Gamma:\partial_\mu\to \partial_\mu\rfloor\Gamma=\partial_\mu +\Gamma^i_\mu\partial_i\,.$$

In particular, the connection Γ in 3 yields the horizontal lift of any vector field τ = τ^{μ} ∂_{μ} on X to a projectable vector field

$$\Gamma \tau=\tau\rfloor\Gamma=\tau^\mu\left(\partial_\mu +\Gamma^i_\mu\partial_i\right)\subset \mathrm{H}Y$$

on Y.

=== Connection as a vertical-valued form ===
The horizontal splitting 2 of the exact sequence 1 defines the corresponding splitting of the dual exact sequence

$$0\to Y\times_X \mathrm{T}^*X \to \mathrm{T}^*Y\to \mathrm{V}^*Y\to 0\,,$$

where T*Y and T*X are the cotangent bundles of Y, respectively, and V*Y → Y is the dual bundle to VY → Y, called the vertical cotangent bundle. This splitting is given by the vertical-valued form

$$\Gamma= \left(dy^i -\Gamma^i_\lambda dx^\lambda\right)\otimes\partial_i\,,$$

which also represents a connection on a fibered manifold.

Treating a connection as a vertical-valued form, one comes to the following important construction. Given a fibered manifold Y → X, let f : X′ → X be a morphism and f ∗ Y → X′ the pullback bundle of Y by f. Then any connection Γ 3 on Y → X induces the pullback connection

$$f*\Gamma=\left(dy^i-\left(\Gamma\circ \tilde f\right)^i_\lambda\frac{\partial f^\lambda}{\partial x'^\mu}dx'^\mu\right)\otimes\partial_i$$

on f ∗ Y → X′.

=== Connection as a jet bundle section ===
Let J^{1}Y be the jet manifold of sections of a fibered manifold Y → X, with coordinates (x^{μ}, y^{i}, y^{i}_{μ}). Due to the canonical imbedding

$$\mathrm{J}^1Y\to_Y \left(Y\times_X \mathrm{T}^*X \right)\otimes_Y \mathrm{T}Y\,, \qquad  \left(y^i_\mu\right)\to dx^\mu\otimes \left(\partial_\mu + y^i_\mu\partial_i\right)\,,$$

any connection Γ 3 on a fibered manifold Y → X is represented by a global section

$$\Gamma :Y\to \mathrm{J}^1Y\,, \qquad y_\lambda^i\circ\Gamma=\Gamma_\lambda^i\,,$$

of the jet bundle J^{1}Y → Y, and vice versa. It is an affine bundle modelled on a vector bundle

$\left(Y\times_X T^*X \right)\otimes_Y \mathrm{V}Y\to Y\,.$	4

There are the following corollaries of this fact.

1. Connections on a fibered manifold Y → X make up an affine space modelled on the vector space of soldering forms
  $\sigma=\sigma^i_\mu dx^\mu\otimes\partial_i$	5
  on Y → X, i.e., sections of the vector bundle 4.
2. Connection coefficients possess the coordinate transformation law
  $${\Gamma'}^i_\lambda = \frac{\partial x^\mu}{\partial {x'}^\lambda}\left(\partial_\mu {y'}^i+\Gamma^j_\mu\partial_j{y'}^i\right)\,.$$
3. Every connection Γ on a fibered manifold Y → X yields the first order differential operator
  $$D_\Gamma:\mathrm{J}^1Y\to_Y \mathrm{T}^*X\otimes_Y \mathrm{V}Y\,, \qquad D_\Gamma = \left(y^i_\lambda -\Gamma^i_\lambda\right)dx^\lambda\otimes\partial_i\,,$$
  on Y called the covariant differential relative to the connection Γ. If s : X → Y is a section, its covariant differential
  $$\nabla^\Gamma s = \left(\partial_\lambda s^i - \Gamma_\lambda^i\circ s\right) dx^\lambda\otimes \partial_i\,,$$
  and the covariant derivative
  $$\nabla_\tau^\Gamma s=\tau\rfloor\nabla^\Gamma s$$
  along a vector field τ on X are defined.

== Curvature and torsion ==
Given the connection Γ 3 on a fibered manifold Y → X, its curvature is defined as the Nijenhuis differential

$$\begin{align}
R&=\tfrac12 d_\Gamma\Gamma\\&=\tfrac12 [\Gamma,\Gamma]_\mathrm{FN} \\&= \tfrac12 R_{\lambda\mu}^i \, dx^\lambda\wedge dx^\mu\otimes\partial_i\,, \\
R_{\lambda\mu}^i &= \partial_\lambda\Gamma_\mu^i - \partial_\mu\Gamma_\lambda^i + \Gamma_\lambda^j\partial_j \Gamma_\mu^i - \Gamma_\mu^j\partial_j \Gamma_\lambda^i\,.
\end{align}$$

This is a vertical-valued horizontal two-form on Y.

Given the connection Γ 3 and the soldering form σ 5, a torsion of Γ with respect to σ is defined as

$$T = d_\Gamma \sigma = \left(\partial_\lambda\sigma_\mu^i + \Gamma_\lambda^j\partial_j\sigma_\mu^i -\partial_j\Gamma_\lambda^i\sigma_\mu^j\right) \, dx^\lambda\wedge dx^\mu\otimes \partial_i\,.$$

== Bundle of principal connections ==
Let π : P → M be a principal bundle with a structure Lie group G. A principal connection on P usually is described by a Lie algebra-valued connection one-form on P. At the same time, a principal connection on P is a global section of the jet bundle J^{1}P → P which is equivariant with respect to the canonical right action of G in P. Therefore, it is represented by a global section of the quotient bundle C = J^{1}P/G → M, called the bundle of principal connections. It is an affine bundle modelled on the vector bundle VP/G → M whose typical fiber is the Lie algebra g of structure group G, and where G acts on fibers by the adjoint representation. There is the canonical imbedding of C to the quotient bundle TP/G which also is called the bundle of principal connections.

Given a basis {e_{m}} for a Lie algebra of G, the fiber bundle C is endowed with bundle coordinates (x^{μ}, a^{m}_{μ}), and its sections are represented by vector-valued one-forms

$$A=dx^\lambda\otimes \left(\partial_\lambda + a^m_\lambda {\mathrm e}_m\right)\,,$$

where

$$a^m_\lambda \, dx^\lambda\otimes {\mathrm e}_m$$

are the familiar local connection forms on M.

Let us note that the jet bundle J^{1}C of C is a configuration space of Yang–Mills gauge theory. It admits the canonical decomposition

$$\begin{align} a_{\lambda\mu}^r &= \tfrac12\left(F_{\lambda\mu}^r + S_{\lambda\mu}^r\right) \\
&= \tfrac12\left(a_{\lambda\mu}^r + a_{\mu\lambda}^r - c_{pq}^r a_\lambda^p a_\mu^q\right) + \tfrac12\left(a_{\lambda\mu}^r - a_{\mu\lambda}^r + c_{pq}^r a_\lambda^p a_\mu^q\right)\,, \end{align}$$

where

$$F=\tfrac{1}{2} F_{\lambda\mu}^m \, dx^\lambda\wedge dx^\mu\otimes {\mathrm e}_m$$

is called the strength form of a principal connection.

== See also ==
- Connection (mathematics)
- Fibred manifold
- Ehresmann connection
- Connection (principal bundle)
