= Classical unified field theories =

Theoretical attempts to unify the forces of nature

Since the 19th century, some physicists, notably Albert Einstein, have attempted to develop a single theoretical framework that can account for all the fundamental forces of nature – a unified field theory. Classical unified field theories are attempts to create a unified field theory based on classical physics. In particular, unification of gravitation and electromagnetism was actively pursued by several physicists and mathematicians in the years between the two World Wars. This work spurred the purely mathematical development of differential geometry.

This article describes various attempts at formulating a classical (non-quantum), relativistic unified field theory. For a survey of classical relativistic field theories of gravitation that have been motivated by theoretical concerns other than unification, see Classical theories of gravitation. For a survey of current work toward creating a quantum theory of gravitation, see quantum gravity.

== Overview ==
The early attempts at creating a unified field theory began with the Riemannian geometry of general relativity, and attempted to incorporate electromagnetic fields into a more general geometry, since ordinary Riemannian geometry seemed incapable of expressing the properties of the electromagnetic field. Einstein was not alone in his attempts to unify electromagnetism and gravity; a large number of mathematicians and physicists, including Hermann Weyl, Arthur Eddington, and Theodor Kaluza also attempted to develop approaches that could unify these interactions. These scientists pursued several avenues of generalization, including extending the foundations of geometry and adding an extra spatial dimension.

== Early work ==
The first attempts to provide a unified theory were by G. Mie in 1912 and Ernst Reichenbacher in 1916. However, these theories were unsatisfactory, as they did not incorporate general relativity because general relativity had yet to be formulated. These efforts, along with those of Rudolf Förster, involved making the metric tensor (which had previously been assumed to be symmetric and real-valued) into an asymmetric and/or complex-valued tensor, and they also attempted to create a field theory for matter as well.

== Differential geometry and field theory ==
From 1918 until 1923, there were three distinct approaches to field theory: the gauge theory of Weyl, Kaluza's five-dimensional theory, and Eddington's development of affine geometry. Einstein corresponded with these researchers, and collaborated with Kaluza, but was not yet fully involved in the unification effort.

== Weyl's infinitesimal geometry ==
In order to include electromagnetism into the geometry of general relativity, Hermann Weyl worked to generalize the Riemannian geometry upon which general relativity is based. His idea was to create a more general infinitesimal geometry. He noted that in addition to a metric field there could be additional degrees of freedom along a path between two points in a manifold, and he tried to exploit this by introducing a basic method for comparison of local size measures along such a path, in terms of a gauge field. This geometry generalized Riemannian geometry in that there was a vector field Q, in addition to the metric g, which together gave rise to both the electromagnetic and gravitational fields. This theory was mathematically sound, albeit complicated, resulting in difficult and high-order field equations. The critical mathematical ingredients in this theory, the Lagrangians and curvature tensor, were worked out by Weyl and colleagues. Then Weyl carried out an extensive correspondence with Einstein and others as to its physical validity, and the theory was ultimately found to be physically unreasonable. However, Weyl's principle of gauge invariance was later applied in a modified form to quantum field theory.

== Kaluza's fifth dimension ==
Kaluza's approach to unification was to embed space-time into a five-dimensional cylindrical world, consisting of four space dimensions and one time dimension. Unlike Weyl's approach, Riemannian geometry was maintained, and the extra dimension allowed for the incorporation of the electromagnetic field vector into the geometry. Despite the relative mathematical elegance of this approach, in collaboration with Einstein and Einstein's aide Grommer it was determined that this theory did not admit a non-singular, static, spherically symmetric solution. This theory did have some influence on Einstein's later work and was further developed later by Klein in an attempt to incorporate relativity into quantum theory, in what is now known as Kaluza–Klein theory.

== Eddington's affine geometry ==
Sir Arthur Stanley Eddington was a noted astronomer who became an enthusiastic and influential promoter of Einstein's general theory of relativity. He was among the first to propose an extension of the gravitational theory based on the affine connection as the fundamental structure field rather than the metric tensor which was the original focus of general relativity. Affine connection is the basis for parallel transport of vectors from one space-time point to another; Eddington assumed the affine connection to be symmetric in its covariant indices, because it seemed plausible that the result of parallel-transporting one infinitesimal vector along another should produce the same result as transporting the second along the first. (Later workers revisited this assumption.)

Eddington emphasized what he considered to be epistemological considerations; for example, he thought that the cosmological constant version of the general-relativistic field equation expressed the property that the universe was "self-gauging". Since the simplest cosmological model (the De Sitter universe) that solves that equation is a spherically symmetric, stationary, closed universe (exhibiting a cosmological red shift, which is more conventionally interpreted as due to expansion), it seemed to explain the overall form of the universe.

Like many other classical unified field theorists, Eddington considered that in the Einstein field equations for general relativity the stress–energy tensor $T_{\mu\nu}$, which represents matter/energy, was merely provisional, and that in a truly unified theory the source term would automatically arise as some aspect of the free-space field equations. He also shared the hope that an improved fundamental theory would explain why the two elementary particles then known (proton and electron) have quite different masses.

The Dirac equation for the relativistic quantum electron caused Eddington to rethink his previous conviction that fundamental physical theory had to be based on tensors. He subsequently devoted his efforts into development of a "Fundamental Theory" based largely on algebraic notions (which he called "E-frames"). Unfortunately his descriptions of this theory were sketchy and difficult to understand, so very few physicists followed up on his work.

== Einstein's geometric approaches ==
When the equivalent of Maxwell's equations for electromagnetism is formulated within the framework of Einstein's theory of general relativity, the electromagnetic field energy (being equivalent to mass as defined by Einstein's equation E=mc^{2}) contributes to the stress tensor and thus to the curvature of space-time, which is the general-relativistic representation of the gravitational field; or putting it another way, certain configurations of curved space-time incorporate effects of an electromagnetic field. This suggests that a purely geometric theory ought to treat these two fields as different aspects of the same basic phenomenon. However, ordinary Riemannian geometry is unable to describe the properties of the electromagnetic field as a purely geometric phenomenon.

Einstein tried to form a generalized theory of gravitation that would unify the gravitational and electromagnetic forces (and perhaps others), guided by a belief in a single origin for the entire set of physical laws. These attempts initially concentrated on additional geometric notions such as vierbeins and "distant parallelism", but eventually centered around treating both the metric tensor and the affine connection as fundamental fields. (Because they are not independent, the metric-affine theory was somewhat complicated.) In general relativity, these fields are symmetric (in the matrix sense), but since antisymmetry seemed essential for electromagnetism, the symmetry requirement was relaxed for one or both fields. Einstein's proposed unified-field equations (fundamental laws of physics) were generally derived from a variational principle expressed in terms of the Riemann curvature tensor for the presumed space-time manifold.

In field theories of this kind, particles appear as limited regions in space-time in which the field strength or the energy density is particularly high. Einstein and coworker Leopold Infeld managed to demonstrate that, in Einstein's final theory of the unified field, true singularities of the field did have trajectories resembling point particles. However, singularities are places where the equations break down, and Einstein believed that in an ultimate theory the laws should apply everywhere, with particles being soliton-like solutions to the (highly nonlinear) field equations. Further, the large-scale topology of the universe should impose restrictions on the solutions, such as quantization or discrete symmetries.

The degree of abstraction, combined with a relative lack of good mathematical tools for analyzing nonlinear equation systems, make it hard to connect such theories with the physical phenomena that they might describe. For example, it has been suggested that the torsion (antisymmetric part of the affine connection) might be related to isospin rather than electromagnetism; this is related to a discrete (or "internal") symmetry known to Einstein as "displacement field duality".

Einstein became increasingly isolated in his research on a generalized theory of gravitation, and most physicists consider his attempts ultimately unsuccessful. In particular, his pursuit of a unification of the fundamental forces ignored developments in quantum physics (and vice versa), most notably the discovery of the strong nuclear force and weak nuclear force.

== Schrödinger's pure-affine theory ==
Inspired by Einstein's approach to a unified field theory and Eddington's idea of the affine connection as the sole basis for differential geometric structure for space-time, Erwin Schrödinger from 1940 to 1951 thoroughly investigated pure-affine formulations of generalized gravitational theory. Although he initially assumed a symmetric affine connection, like Einstein he later considered the nonsymmetric field.

Schrödinger's most striking discovery during this work was that the metric tensor was induced upon the manifold via a simple construction from the Riemann curvature tensor, which was in turn formed entirely from the affine connection. Further, taking this approach with the simplest feasible basis for the variational principle resulted in a field equation having the form of Einstein's general-relativistic field equation with a cosmological term arising automatically.

Skepticism from Einstein and published criticisms from other physicists discouraged Schrödinger, and his work in this area has been largely ignored.

== Later work ==
After the 1930s, progressively fewer scientists worked on classical unification, due to the continued development of quantum-theoretical descriptions of the non-gravitational fundamental forces of nature and the difficulties encountered in developing a quantum theory of gravity. Einstein pressed on with his attempts to theoretically unify gravity and electromagnetism, but he became increasingly isolated in this research, which he pursued until his death. Einstein's celebrity status brought much attention to his final quest, which ultimately saw limited success.

Most physicists, on the other hand, eventually abandoned classical unified theories. Current mainstream research on unified field theories focuses on the problem of creating a quantum theory of gravity and unifying with the other fundamental theories in physics, all of which are quantum field theories. (Some programs, such as string theory, attempt to solve both of these problems at once.) Of the four known fundamental forces, gravity remains the one force for which unification with the others proves problematic.

Although new "classical" unified field theories continue to be proposed from time to time, often involving non-traditional elements such as spinors or relating gravitation to an electromagnetic force, none have been generally accepted by physicists yet.

== See also ==
- Affine gauge theory
- Classical field theory
- Gauge gravitation theory
- Metric-affine gravitation theory
