= Affine bundle =

Type of fiber bundle

In differential geometry, an area of mathematics, an affine bundle is a fiber bundle whose typical fiber is an affine space and whose trivialization morphisms and transition functions are affine.

== Formal definition ==
Let $\overline\pi:\overline Y\to X$ be a vector bundle with a typical fiber a vector space $\overline F$. An affine bundle modelled on $\overline\pi:\overline Y\to X$ is a fiber bundle $\pi:Y\to X$ whose typical fiber $F$ is an affine space modelled on $\overline F$ so that the following conditions hold:

(i) Every fiber $Y_x$ of $Y$ is an affine space modelled over the corresponding fiber $\overline Y_x$ of the vector bundle $\overline Y$.

(ii) There is a bundle atlas of $Y\to X$ whose local trivialization morphisms and transition functions are affine isomorphisms. Such an atlas is called an affine bundle atlas.

When dealing with affine bundles, one uses affine bundle coordinates $(x^\mu,y^i)$ possessing affine transition functions

$$y'^i= A^i_j(x^\nu)y^j + b^i(x^\nu).$$

There are the bundle morphisms

$$Y\times_X\overline Y\longrightarrow Y,\qquad (y^i, \overline y^i)\longmapsto  y^i +\overline y^i,$$

$$Y\times_X Y\longrightarrow \overline Y,\qquad (y^i, y'^i)\longmapsto  y^i - y'^i,$$

where $(\overline y^i)$ are linear bundle coordinates on a vector bundle $\overline Y$, possessing linear transition functions $\overline y'^i= A^i_j(x^\nu)\overline y^j$.

== Properties ==
An affine bundle has a global section, but in contrast with vector bundles, there is no canonical global section of an affine bundle. Let $\pi:Y\to X$ be an affine bundle modelled on a vector bundle $\overline\pi:\overline Y\to X$. Every global section $s$ of an affine bundle $Y\to X$ yields the bundle morphisms

$$Y\ni y\to y-s(\pi(y))\in \overline Y, \qquad
\overline Y\ni \overline y\to s(\pi(y))+\overline y\in Y.$$

In particular, every vector bundle $Y$ has a natural structure of an affine bundle due to these morphisms where $s=0$ is the canonical zero-valued section of $Y$. For instance, the tangent bundle $TX$ of a manifold $X$ naturally is an affine bundle.

An affine bundle $Y\to X$ is a fiber bundle with a general affine structure group $GA(m,\mathbb R)$ of affine transformations of its typical fiber $V$ of dimension $m$. This structure group always is reducible to a general linear group $GL(m, \mathbb R)$, i.e., an affine bundle admits an atlas with linear transition functions.

By a morphism of affine bundles is meant a bundle morphism $\Phi:Y\to Y'$ whose restriction to each fiber of $Y$ is an affine map. Every affine bundle morphism $\Phi:Y\to Y'$ of an affine bundle $Y$ modelled on a vector bundle $\overline Y$ to an affine bundle $Y'$ modelled on a vector bundle $\overline Y'$ yields a unique linear bundle morphism

$$\overline \Phi: \overline Y\to \overline Y', \qquad \overline y'^i=
\frac{\partial\Phi^i}{\partial y^j}\overline y^j,$$

called the linear derivative of $\Phi$.

== Connection ==
A connection on an affine bundle is a specialisation to affine bundles of the more general notion of a connection on a principal bundle. Let Y → X be an affine bundle modelled over a vector bundle Y̅ → X. A connection Γ on Y → X is called an affine connection if, as a section Γ : Y → J^{1}Y of the jet bundle J^{1}Y → Y of Y, it is an affine bundle morphism over X. This is closely related to the general meaning of an affine connection on the tangent bundle TX of a smooth manifold X.

With respect to affine bundle coordinates (x^{λ}, y^{i}) on Y, an affine connection Γ on Y → X is given by the tangent-valued connection form

$$\begin{align}\Gamma &=dx^\lambda\otimes \left(\partial_\lambda + \Gamma_\lambda^i\partial_i\right)\,, \\ \Gamma_\lambda^i&={{\Gamma_\lambda}^i}_j\left(x^\nu\right) y^j + \sigma_\lambda^i\left(x^\nu\right)\,. \end{align}$$

An affine bundle is a fiber bundle with a general affine structure group GA(m, ℝ) of affine transformations of its typical fiber V of dimension m. Therefore, an affine connection is associated to a principal connection. It always exists.

For any affine connection Γ : Y → J^{1}Y, the corresponding linear derivative Γ̅ : Y̅ → J^{1}Y̅ of an affine morphism Γ defines a unique linear connection on a vector bundle Y̅ → X. With respect to linear bundle coordinates (x^{λ}, y̅^{i}) on Y̅, this connection reads

$$\overline \Gamma=dx^\lambda\otimes\left(\partial_\lambda +{{\Gamma_\lambda}^i}_j\left(x^\nu\right) \overline y^j\overline\partial_i\right)\,.$$

Since every vector bundle is an affine bundle, any linear connection on a vector bundle also is an affine connection.

If Y → X is a vector bundle, both an affine connection Γ and an associated linear connection Γ̅ are connections on the same vector bundle Y → X, and their difference is a basic soldering form on

$$\sigma= \sigma_\lambda^i(x^\nu) dx^\lambda\otimes\partial_i \,.$$

Thus, every affine connection on a vector bundle Y → X is a sum of a linear connection and a basic soldering form on Y → X.

Due to the canonical vertical splitting VY = Y × Y, this soldering form is brought into a vector-valued form

$$\sigma= \sigma_\lambda^i(x^\nu) dx^\lambda\otimes e_i$$

where e_{i} is a fiber basis for Y.

Given an affine connection Γ on a vector bundle Y → X, let R and R̅ be the curvatures of a connection Γ and the associated linear connection Γ̅, respectively. It is readily observed that R = R̅ + T, where

$$\begin{align}
T &=\tfrac12 T_{\lambda\mu}^i dx^\lambda\wedge dx^\mu\otimes \partial_i\,, \\
T_{\lambda \mu}^i &= \partial_\lambda\sigma_\mu^i - \partial_\mu\sigma_\lambda^i + \sigma_\lambda^h {{\Gamma_\mu}^i}_h - \sigma_\mu^h {{\Gamma_\lambda}^i}_h\,,
\end{align}$$

is the torsion of Γ with respect to the basic soldering form σ.

In particular, consider the tangent bundle TX of a manifold X coordinated by (x^{μ}, ẋ^{μ}). There is the canonical soldering form

$$\theta=dx^\mu\otimes \dot\partial_\mu$$

on TX which coincides with the tautological one-form

$$\theta_X=dx^\mu\otimes \partial_\mu$$

on X due to the canonical vertical splitting VTX = TX × TX. Given an arbitrary linear connection Γ on TX, the corresponding affine connection

$$\begin{align}
A&=\Gamma +\theta\,, \\
A_\lambda^\mu&={{\Gamma_\lambda}^\mu}_\nu \dot x^\nu +\delta^\mu_\lambda\,,
\end{align}$$

on TX is the Cartan connection. The torsion of the Cartan connection A with respect to the soldering form θ coincides with the torsion of a linear connection Γ, and its curvature is a sum R + T of the curvature and the torsion of Γ.

== See also ==
- Fiber bundle
- Fibered manifold
- Vector bundle
- Affine space
