= Fibered manifold =

Concept in differential geometry

In differential geometry, in the category of differentiable manifolds, a fibered manifold is a surjective submersion
$$\pi : E \to B\,$$
that is, a surjective differentiable mapping such that at each point $y \in E$ the tangent mapping
$$T_y \pi : T_{y} E \to T_{\pi(y)}B$$
is surjective, or, equivalently, its rank equals $\dim B.$

== History ==
In topology, the words fiber (Faser in German) and fiber space (gefaserter Raum) appeared for the first time in a paper by Herbert Seifert in 1932, but his definitions are limited to a very special case. The main difference from the present day conception of a fiber space, however, was that for Seifert what is now called the base space (topological space) of a fiber (topological) space $E$ was not part of the structure, but derived from it as a quotient space of $E.$ The first definition of fiber space is given by Hassler Whitney in 1935 under the name sphere space, but in 1940 Whitney changed the name to sphere bundle.

The theory of fibered spaces, of which vector bundles, principal bundles, topological fibrations and fibered manifolds are a special case, is attributed to Seifert, Hopf, Feldbau, Whitney, Steenrod, Ehresmann, Serre, and others.

== Formal definition ==
A triple $(E, \pi, B)$ where $E$ and $B$ are differentiable manifolds and $\pi : E \to B$ is a surjective submersion, is called a fibered manifold. $E$ is called the total space, $B$ is called the base.

== Examples ==
- Every differentiable fiber bundle is a fibered manifold.
- Every differentiable covering space is a fibered manifold with discrete fiber.
- In general, a fibered manifold need not be a fiber bundle: different fibers may have different topologies. An example of this phenomenon may be constructed by restricting projection to total space of any vector bundle over smooth manifold with removed base space embedded by global section, finitely many points or any closed submanifold not containing a fiber in general.

== Properties ==
- Any surjective submersion $\pi : E \to B$ is open: for each open $V \subseteq E,$ the set $\pi(V) \subseteq B$ is open in $B.$
- Each fiber $\pi^{-1}(b) \subseteq E, b \in B$ is a closed embedded submanifold of $E$ of dimension $\dim E - \dim B.$
- A fibered manifold admits local sections: For each $y \in E$ there is an open neighborhood $U$ of $\pi(y)$ in $B$ and a smooth mapping $s : U \to E$ with $\pi \circ s = \operatorname{Id}_U$ and $s(\pi(y)) = y.$
- A surjection $\pi : E \to B$ is a fibered manifold if and only if there exists a local section $s : B \to E$ of $\pi$ (with $\pi \circ s = \operatorname{Id}_B$) passing through each $y \in E.$

== Fibered coordinates ==
Let $B$ (resp. $E$) be an $n$-dimensional (resp. $p$-dimensional) manifold. A fibered manifold $(E, \pi, B)$ admits fiber charts. We say that a chart $(V, \psi)$ on $E$ is a fiber chart, or is adapted to the surjective submersion $\pi : E \to B$ if there exists a chart $(U, \varphi)$ on $B$ such that $U = \pi(V)$ and
$$u^1 = x^1\circ \pi,\,u^2 = x^2\circ \pi,\,\dots,\,u^n = x^n\circ \pi\, ,$$
where
$$\begin{align}\psi &= \left(u^1,\dots,u^n,y^1,\dots,y^{p-n}\right). \quad y_{0}\in V,\\
\varphi &= \left(x^1,\dots,x^n\right), \quad \pi\left(y_0\right)\in U.\end{align}$$

The above fiber chart condition may be equivalently expressed by
$$\varphi\circ\pi = \mathrm{pr}_1\circ\psi,$$
where
$${\mathrm {pr}_1} : {\R^n}\times{\R^{p-n}} \to {\R^n}\,$$
is the projection onto the first $n$ coordinates. The chart $(U, \varphi)$ is then obviously unique. In view of the above property, the fibered coordinates of a fiber chart $(V, \psi)$ are usually denoted by $\psi = \left(x^i, y^{\sigma}\right)$ where $i \in \{1, \ldots, n\},$ $\sigma \in \{1, \ldots, m\},$ $m = p - n$ the coordinates of the corresponding chart $(U, \varphi)$ on $B$ are then denoted, with the obvious convention, by $\varphi = \left(x_i\right)$ where $i \in \{1, \ldots, n\}.$

Conversely, if a surjection $\pi : E \to B$ admits a fibered atlas, then $\pi : E \to B$ is a fibered manifold.

== Local trivialization and fiber bundles ==
Let $E \to B$ be a fibered manifold and $V$ any manifold. Then an open covering $\left\{U_{\alpha}\right\}$ of $B$ together with maps
$$\psi : \pi^{-1}\left(U_\alpha\right) \to U_\alpha \times V,$$
called trivialization maps, such that
$$\mathrm{pr}_1 \circ \psi_\alpha = \pi, \text{ for all } \alpha$$
is a local trivialization with respect to $V.$

A fibered manifold together with a manifold $V$ is a fiber bundle with typical fiber (or just fiber) $V$ if it admits a local trivialization with respect to $V.$ The atlas $\Psi = \left\{\left(U_{\alpha}, \psi_{\alpha}\right)\right\}$ is then called a bundle atlas.

== See also ==
- Algebraic fiber space
- Connection (fibred manifold) – Operation on fibered manifolds
- Covering space – Type of continuous map in topology
- Fiber bundle – Continuous surjection satisfying a local triviality condition
- Fibration – Concept in algebraic topology
- Natural bundle
- Quasi-fibration – Concept from mathematics
- Seifert fiber space – Topological space
