= Ehresmann connection =

Differential geometry construct on fiber bundles

In differential geometry, an Ehresmann connection (after the French mathematician Charles Ehresmann who first formalized this concept) is a version of the notion of a connection, which makes sense on any smooth fiber bundle. In particular, it does not rely on the possible vector bundle structure of the underlying fiber bundle, but nevertheless, linear connections may be viewed as a special case. Another important special case of Ehresmann connections are principal connections on principal bundles, which are required to be equivariant in the principal Lie group action.

== Introduction ==
A covariant derivative in differential geometry is a linear differential operator which takes the directional derivative of a section of a vector bundle in a covariant manner. It also allows one to formulate a notion of a parallel section of a bundle in the direction of a vector: a section s is parallel along a vector $X$ if $\nabla_X s = 0$. So a covariant derivative provides at least two things: a differential operator, and a notion of what it means to be parallel in each direction. An Ehresmann connection drops the differential operator completely and defines a connection axiomatically in terms of the sections parallel in each direction (Ehresmann 1950). Specifically, an Ehresmann connection singles out a vector subspace of each tangent space to the total space of the fiber bundle, called the horizontal space. A section $s$ is then horizontal (i.e., parallel) in the direction $X$ if ${\rm d}s(X)$ lies in a horizontal space. Here we are regarding $s$ as a function $s\colon M\to E$ from the base $M$ to the fiber bundle $E$, so that ${\rm d}s\colon TM\to TE$ is then the pushforward of tangent vectors. The horizontal spaces together form a vector subbundle of $TE$.

This has the immediate benefit of being definable on a much broader class of structures than mere vector bundles. In particular, it is well-defined on a general fiber bundle. Furthermore, many of the features of the covariant derivative still remain: parallel transport, curvature, and holonomy.

The missing ingredient of the connection, apart from linearity, is covariance. With the classical covariant derivatives, covariance is an a posteriori feature of the derivative. In their construction one specifies the transformation law of the Christoffel symbols – which is not covariant – and then general covariance of the derivative follows as a result. For an Ehresmann connection, it is possible to impose a generalized covariance principle from the beginning by introducing a Lie group acting on the fibers of the fiber bundle. The appropriate condition is to require that the horizontal spaces be, in a certain sense, equivariant with respect to the group action.

The finishing touch for an Ehresmann connection is that it can be represented as a differential form, in much the same way as the case of a connection form. If the group acts on the fibers and the connection is equivariant, then the form will also be equivariant. Furthermore, the connection form allows for a definition of curvature as a curvature form as well.

== Formal definition ==
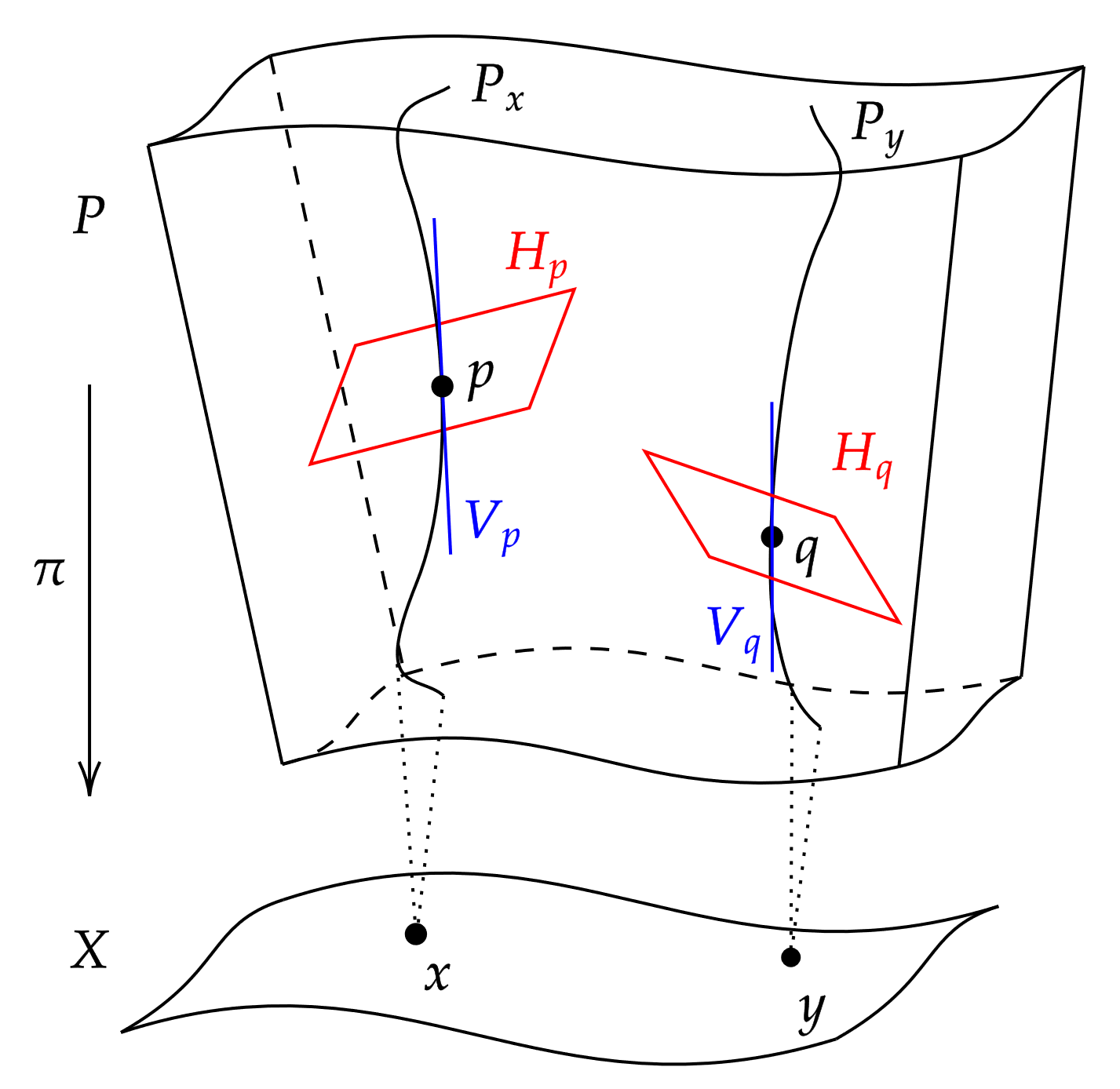
An Ehresmann connection is a choice of horizontal subspace $H_p\subset T_pP$ for every $p\in P$, where $P$ is some fiber bundle, typically a principal bundle.

Let $\pi\colon E\to M$ be a smooth fiber bundle. Let

$$V= \ker (\operatorname{d} \pi \colon TE\to TM)$$

be the vertical bundle consisting of the vectors "tangent to the fibers" of E, i.e. the fiber of V at $e\in E$ is $V_e =T_e(E_{\pi(e)})$. This subbundle of $TE$ is canonically defined even when there is no canonical subspace tangent to the base space M. (Of course, this asymmetry comes from the very definition of a fiber bundle, which "only has one projection" $\pi\colon E\to M$ while a product $E=M\times F$ would have two.)

=== Definition via horizontal subspaces ===
An Ehresmann connection on $E$ is a smooth subbundle $H$ of $TE$, called the horizontal bundle of the connection, which is complementary to V, in the sense that it defines a direct sum decomposition $TE=H\oplus V$. In more detail, the horizontal bundle has the following properties.

- For each point $e\in E$, $H_e$ is a vector subspace of the tangent space $T_e E$ to $E$ at $e$, called the horizontal subspace of the connection at $e$.
- $H_e$ depends smoothly on $e$.
- For each $e\in E$, $H_e \cap V_e = \{0\}$.
- Any tangent vector in $T_e E$ (for any $e\in E$) is the sum of a horizontal and vertical component, so that $T_eE =H_e+V_e$.

In more sophisticated terms, such an assignment of horizontal spaces satisfying these properties corresponds precisely to a smooth section of the jet bundle $J^1E\rightarrow E$.

=== Definition via a connection form ===
Equivalently, let Φ be the projection onto the vertical bundle V along H (so that H = ker Φ). This is determined by the above direct sum decomposition of TE into horizontal and vertical parts and is sometimes called the connection form of the Ehresmann connection. Thus Φ is a vector bundle homomorphism from TE to itself with the following properties (of projections in general):

- Φ^{2} = Φ;
- Φ is the identity on V =Im Φ.

Conversely, if Φ is a vector bundle endomorphism of TE satisfying these two properties, then H = ker Φ is the horizontal subbundle of an Ehresmann connection.

Finally, note that Φ, being a linear mapping of each tangent space into itself, may also be regarded as a TE-valued 1-form on E. This will be a useful perspective in sections to come.

=== Parallel transport via horizontal lifts ===
An Ehresmann connection also prescribes a manner for lifting curves from the base manifold M into the total space of the fiber bundle E so that the tangents to the curve are horizontal. These horizontal lifts are a direct analogue of parallel transport for other versions of the connection formalism.

Specifically, suppose that γ(t) is a smooth curve in M through the point x = γ(0). Let e ∈ E_{x} be a point in the fiber over x. A lift of γ through e is a curve $\tilde{\gamma}(t)$ in the total space E such that

$\tilde{\gamma}(0) = e$, and $\pi(\tilde{\gamma}(t)) = \gamma(t).$

A lift is horizontal if, in addition, every tangent of the curve lies in the horizontal subbundle of TE:

$$\tilde{\gamma}'(t) \in H_{\tilde{\gamma}(t)}.$$

It can be shown using the rank–nullity theorem applied to π and Φ that each vector X∈T_{x}M has a unique horizontal lift to a vector $\tilde{X} \in T_e E$. In particular, the tangent field to γ generates a horizontal vector field in the total space of the pullback bundle γ*E. By the Picard–Lindelöf theorem, this vector field is integrable. Thus, for any curve γ and point e over x = γ(0), there exists a unique horizontal lift of γ through e for small time t.

Note that, for general Ehresmann connections, the horizontal lift is path-dependent. When two smooth curves in M, coinciding at γ_{1}(0) = γ_{2}(0) = x_{0} and also intersecting at another point x_{1} ∈ M, are lifted horizontally to E through the same e ∈ π^{−1}(x_{0}), they will generally pass through different points of π^{−1}(x_{1}). This has important consequences for the differential geometry of fiber bundles: the space of sections of H is not a Lie subalgebra of the space of vector fields on E, because it is not (in general) closed under the Lie bracket of vector fields. This failure of closure under Lie bracket is measured by the curvature.

== Properties ==
=== Curvature ===
Let Φ be an Ehresmann connection. Then the curvature of Φ is given by

$$R = \tfrac{1}{2}[\varPhi,\varPhi]$$

where [-,-] denotes the Frölicher-Nijenhuis bracket of Φ ∈ Ω^{1}(E,TE) with itself. Thus R ∈ Ω^{2}(E,TE) is the two-form on E with values in TE defined by

$$R(X,Y) = \varPhi\left([(\mathrm{id} - \varPhi)X,(\mathrm{id} - \varPhi)Y]\right)$$,

or, in other terms,

$$R\left(X,Y\right) = \left[X_H,Y_H\right]_V$$,

where X = X_{H} + X_{V} denotes the direct sum decomposition into H and V components, respectively. From this last expression for the curvature, it is seen to vanish identically if, and only if, the horizontal subbundle is Frobenius integrable. Thus the curvature is the integrability condition for the horizontal subbundle to yield transverse sections of the fiber bundle E → M.

The curvature of an Ehresmann connection also satisfies a version of the Bianchi identity:

$$\left[\varPhi, R\right] = 0$$

where again [-,-] is the Frölicher-Nijenhuis bracket of Φ ∈ Ω^{1}(E,TE) and R ∈ Ω^{2}(E,TE).

=== Completeness ===
An Ehresmann connection allows curves to have unique horizontal lifts locally. For a complete Ehresmann connection, a curve can be horizontally lifted over its entire domain.

=== Holonomy ===
Flatness of the connection corresponds locally to the Frobenius integrability of the horizontal spaces. At the other extreme, non-vanishing curvature implies the presence of holonomy of the connection.

== Special cases ==
=== Principal bundles and principal connections ===
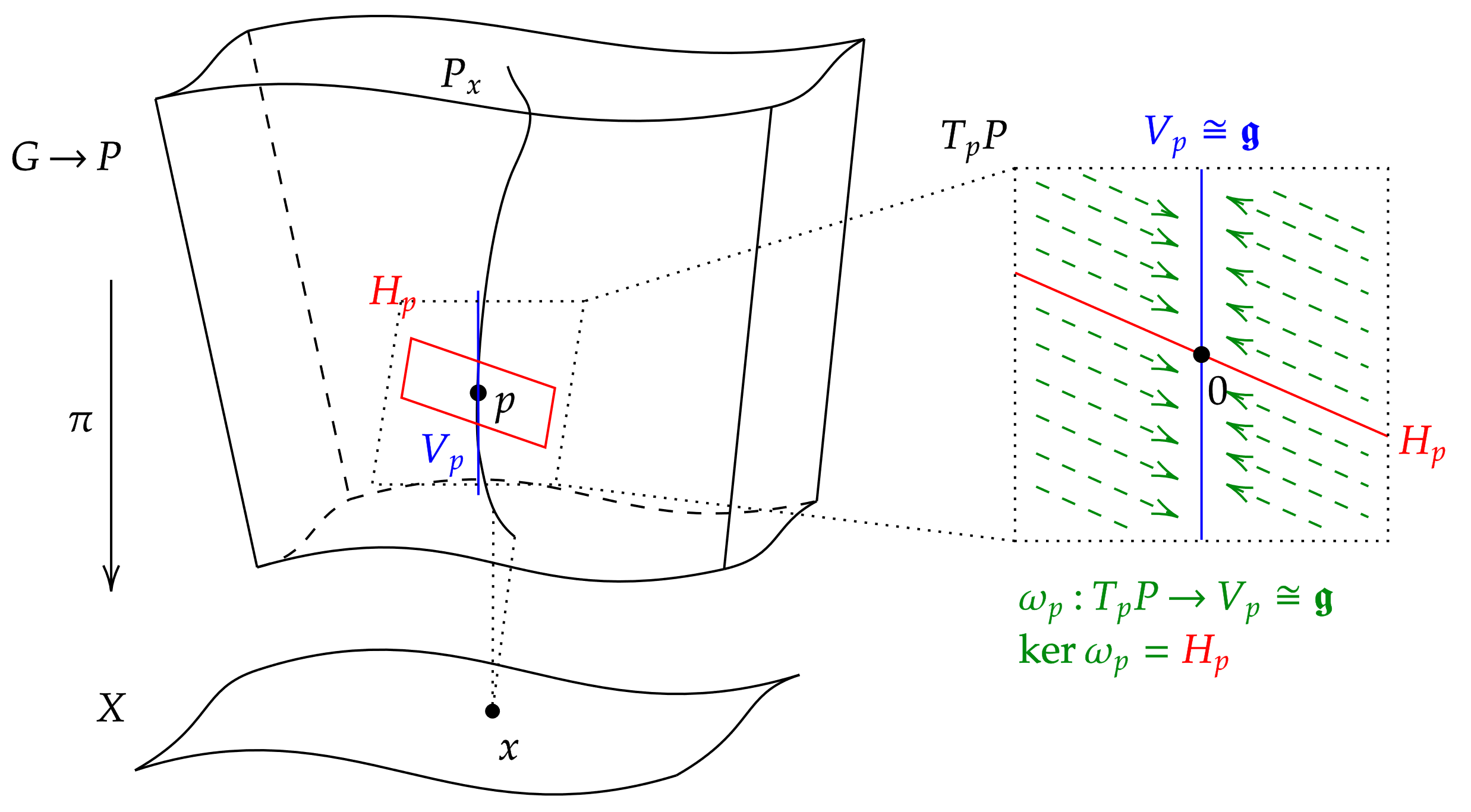
A principal bundle connection form $\omega$ may be thought of as a projection operator on the tangent bundle $TP$ of the principal bundle $P$. The kernel of the connection form is given by the horizontal subspaces for the associated Ehresmann connection.

Suppose that E is a smooth principal G-bundle over M. Then an Ehresmann connection H on E is said to be a principal (Ehresmann) connection if it is invariant with respect to the G action on E in the sense that

$H_{eg}=\mathrm d(R_g)_e (H_{e})$ for any e∈E and g∈G; here $\mathrm d(R_g)_e$ denotes the differential of the right action of g on E at e.

The one-parameter subgroups of G act vertically on E. The differential of this action allows one to identify the subspace $V_e$ with the Lie algebra g of group G, say by map $\iota\colon V_e\to \mathfrak g$. The connection form Φ of the Ehresmann connection may then be viewed as a 1-form ω on E with values in g defined by ω(X)=ι(Φ(X)).

Thus reinterpreted, the connection form ω satisfies the following two properties:

- It transforms equivariantly under the G action: $R_h^*\omega=\hbox{Ad}(h^{-1})\omega$ for all h∈G, where R_{h}^{*} is the pullback under the right action and Ad is the adjoint representation of G on its Lie algebra.
- It maps vertical vector fields to their associated elements of the Lie algebra: ω(X)=ι(X) for all X∈V.

Conversely, it can be shown that such a g-valued 1-form on a principal bundle generates a horizontal distribution satisfying the aforementioned properties.

Given a local trivialization one can reduce ω to the horizontal vector fields (in this trivialization). It defines a 1-form ω' on M via pullback. The form ω' determines ω completely, but it depends on the choice of trivialization. (This form is often also called a connection form and denoted simply by ω.)

=== Vector bundles and covariant derivatives ===
Suppose that E is a smooth vector bundle over M. Then an Ehresmann connection H on E is said to be a linear (Ehresmann) connection if H_{e} depends linearly on e ∈ E_{x} for each x ∈ M. To make this precise, let S_{λ} denote scalar multiplication by λ on E. Then H is linear if and only if $H_{\lambda e} = \mathrm d(S_{\lambda})_e (H_{e})$for any e ∈ E and scalar λ.

Since E is a vector bundle, its vertical bundle V is isomorphic to π*E. Therefore if s is a section of E, then Φ(ds):TM→s*V=s*π*E=E. It is a vector bundle morphism, and is therefore given by a section ∇s of the vector bundle Hom(TM,E). The fact that the Ehresmann connection is linear implies that in addition it verifies for every function $f$ on $M$ the Leibniz rule, i.e. $\nabla(f s) = f\nabla (s) + d(f)\otimes s$, and therefore is a covariant derivative of s.

Conversely a covariant derivative ∇ on a vector bundle defines a linear Ehresmann connection by defining H_{e}, for e ∈ E with x=π(e), to be the image ds_{x}(T_{x}M) where s is a section of E with s(x) = e and ∇_{X}s = 0 for all X ∈ T_{x}M.

Note that (for historical reasons) the term linear when applied to connections, is sometimes used (like the word affine – see Affine connection) to refer to connections defined on the tangent bundle or frame bundle.

=== Associated bundles ===
An Ehresmann connection on a fiber bundle (endowed with a structure group) sometimes gives rise to an Ehresmann connection on an associated bundle. For instance, a (linear) connection in a vector bundle E, thought of giving a parallelism of E as above, induces a connection on the associated bundle of frames PE of E. Conversely, a connection in PE gives rise to a (linear) connection in E provided that the connection in PE is equivariant with respect to the action of the general linear group on the frames (and thus a principal connection). It is not always possible for an Ehresmann connection to induce, in a natural way, a connection on an associated bundle. For example, a non-equivariant Ehresmann connection on a bundle of frames of a vector bundle may not induce a connection on the vector bundle.

Suppose that E is an associated bundle of P, so that E = P ×_{G} F. A G-connection on E is an Ehresmann connection such that the parallel transport map τ : F_{x} → F_{x′} is given by a G-transformation of the fibers (over sufficiently nearby points x and x′ in M joined by a curve).

Given a principal connection on P, one obtains a G-connection on the associated fiber bundle E = P ×_{G} F via pullback.

Conversely, given a G-connection on E it is possible to recover the principal connection on the associated principal bundle P. To recover this principal connection, one introduces the notion of a frame on the typical fiber F. Since G is a finite-dimensional Lie group acting effectively on F, there must exist a finite configuration of points (y_{1},...,y_{m}) within F such that the G-orbit R = {(gy_{1},...,gy_{m}) | g ∈ G} is a principal homogeneous space of G. One can think of R as giving a generalization of the notion of a frame for the G-action on F. Note that, since R is a principal homogeneous space for G, the fiber bundle E(R) associated to E with typical fiber R is (equivalent to) the principal bundle associated to E. But it is also a subbundle of the m-fold product bundle of E with itself. The distribution of horizontal spaces on E induces a distribution of spaces on this product bundle. Since the parallel transport maps associated to the connection are G-maps, they preserve the subspace E(R), and so the G-connection descends to a principal G-connection on E(R).

In summary, there is a one-to-one correspondence (up to equivalence) between the descents of principal connections to associated fiber bundles, and G-connections on associated fiber bundles. For this reason, in the category of fiber bundles with a structure group G, the principal connection contains all relevant information for G-connections on the associated bundles. Hence, unless there is an overriding reason to consider connections on associated bundles (as there is, for instance, in the case of Cartan connections) one usually works directly with the principal connection.
